= Kamal Givens =

American rapper

- Born: March 25, 1981 (age 45); Los Angeles, California, U.S.
- Other name: Chance
- Occupations: Reality television star, rapper
- Years active: 2006–present
- Known for: I Love New York season 1, I Love New York season 2
- Relatives: Ahmad "Real" Givens (brother)

Kamal Givens, born March 25 1981, also known as Chance, is an American reality television star and rapper. He is best known for his appearances on VH1's hit celebreality shows; I Love New York season 1, I Love Money season 1 and for starring in his own dating show alongside brother Ahmad "Real" Givens titled, Real Chance of Love. Givens is also a former Capitol Records artist.

== Early life ==
Givens was the second of four children born to Claudia and Robert Givens in the South Central section of Los Angeles, California. Givens was raised on a horse ranch with his brothers; Ahmad, Micah and Sean Givens, Givens and his brothers Ahmad and Micah were a part of a rap group known as the Stallionaires, in reference to where they were raised.

== Television career ==
Givens and his brother Ahmad, were discovered by VH1 casting producers through their MySpace pages in 2006. The brothers became contestants on the VH1 celebreality show I Love New York season 1. The Bachelor-style dating show featured Tiffany "New York" Pollard, in her quest to find true love following her failed attempts on VH1's Flavor of Love season 1 and season 2. Chance was the runner-up being eliminated in the 11th episode. Givens also made a guest appearance on the second season of I Love New York. In 2008 Givens alongside his brother Ahmad, were contestants on the first season of VH1 celebreality spin-off show I Love Money. The show featured returning contestants from past VH1 dating shows; Flavor of Love, I Love New York and Rock of Love competing in mental and physical challenges for a chance at winning a $250,000 prize. Givens was eliminated in the 6th episode placing 12th overall.

In 2008 VH1 announced Givens (Chance) and brother Ahmad (Real) were hosts to their own celebreality dating show titled; Real Chance of Love, it premiered on October 20 2008. The show consisted of 17 women attempting to win the love and affection of the brothers, splitting in to 2 teams, the "Chance" girls and the "Real" girls. In the finale episode Givens did not choose anyone, claiming he was not ready to fall in love. The show would return of a second season in 2009 with 20 new contestants, the second season saw Givens choose Kamille "Hot Wings" Leai as his winner. A spin-off titled Real and Chance: The Legend Hunters premiered on VH1 on September 19 2010, the show consisted of Chance and Real hunting for mythical creatures.

In 2016 Givens made a guest appearance on TV One series, The Next :15 as a friend of Tiffany Pollard.

In August 2020, it was announced that Givens was starring in his own reality dating show titled One Mo' Chance. The show debuted on the streaming service Zeus Network. On September 29 2021, the second season of the show premiered.

== Personal life ==
In November 2017, Chance was attacked by a monkey in Thailand while filming a documentary.

== Filmography ==
Year	Title	Role	Notes
2007	I Love New York season 1	Self; contestant	Runner-up, 12 episodes
2007	I Love New York season 2	Self; guest	1 episode
2008	I Love Money season 1	Self; contestant	12th place, 8 episodes
2008	Real Chance of Love season 1	Self; bachelor	14 episodes
2008	Up Close with Carrie Keagan	Self; guest	1 episode
2009	Chelsea Lately	Self; guest	1 episode
2009	Real Chance of Love season 2	Self; bachelor	14 episodes
2010	Real and Chance: The Legend Hunters	Self	10 episodes
2011	Reach Around Radio	Self; guest	1 episode
2016	The Next :15	Self; guest	1 episode
2020	One Mo' Chance season 1	Self; bachelor	Web series, 15 episodes
2021	One Mo' Chance season 2	Self; bachelor	Web series, 15 episodes
