= I Love Money season 1 =

I Love Money
- Season 1
- Cast of I Love Money (from left to right): Back: Megan, 12 Pack, Real, Mr. Boston, Whiteboy, Nibblz, The Entertainer, Chance; Front: Heat, Pumkin, Hoopz, Brandi C. Rodeo, Toasteee, Midget Mac, Destiney, Heather
- Presented by: Craig "C.J." Jackson
- No. of contestants: 17
- Winner: Hoopz
- Location: Huatulco, Mexico
- No. of episodes: 14

Release
- Original network: VH1
- Original release: July 6 – October 12, 2008

Season chronology
- Next → Season 2

The first season of I Love Money premiered on VH1 on July 6, 2008 and the casting special aired on July 1. The show was created by The Surreal Life executive producers Cris Abrego and Mark Cronin. The contestants on this series are from the first two seasons of Flavor of Love, I Love New York and Rock of Love, and are competing in physical and mental challenges in an attempt to win $250,000. Production started in early February 2008, and concluded in March 2008.

== Contestants ==
Name	Original Show	Team	Eliminated
Nicole "Hoopz" Alexander	Flavor of Love	Gold	Winner
Joshua "Whiteboy" Gallander	I Love New York	Green	Episode 13 (2nd)
Megan Hauserman	Rock of Love 2	Green	Episode 13 (3rd, QUIT)
Ahmad "Real" Givens †	I Love New York	Green	Episode 13 (4th)
Brooke "Pumkin" Thompson	Flavor of Love	Gold	Episode 11 (5th)
Jennifer "Toastee" Toof	Flavor of Love 2	Gold	Episode 10/11 (6th)
Brandi "Brandi C" Cunningham	Rock of Love	Green	Episode 10 (7th, QUIT)
Frank "The Entertainer" Maresca	I Love New York 2	Gold	Episode 10 (8th)
Heather Chadwell	Rock of Love	Gold	Episode 9 (9th)
David "12 Pack" Amerman	I Love New York	Gold	Episode 8 (10th)
Cindy "Rodeo" Steedle	Rock of Love	Gold	Episode 7 (11th)
Kamal "Chance" Givens	I Love New York	Green	Episode 6 (12th)
Destiney Sue Moore	Rock of Love 2	Green	Episode 5 (13th)
Lee "Mr Boston" Marks	I Love New York	Green	Episode 4 (14th)
Jason "Heat" Rosell	I Love New York	Green	Episode 3 (15th)
Domenique "Nibblz" Majors	Flavor of Love 2	Gold	Episode 2 (16th)
Torrey "Midget Mac" Samuels	I Love New York 2	No Team	Episode 1 (17th)

- The contestants competed as teams (Green and Gold) from Episode 2 to 7, and competed as individuals from Episode 8 to 13 (Episode 12 excluded).
- Toasteee was eliminated during the night that began in Episode 10 and concluded in Episode 11. Her actual elimination was shown in Episode 11, as Episode 10 ended on a cliffhanger.
- Brandi C & Megan quit the competition.

== Episode Progress ==
Contestant	Episode													
Contestant	1	2	3	4	5	6	7	8	9	10	11	13		
Hoopz	WIN	SAFE	WIN	WIN	WIN	WIN	BTM2	SAFE	SAFE	WIN	WIN	BTM3	SAFE	WINNER
Whiteboy	WIN	WIN	SAFE	SAFE	SAFE	SAFE	WIN	BTM2	SAFE	SAFE	BTM2	WIN	SAFE	VOID
Megan	SAFE	WIN	BTM2	SAFE	SAFE	BTM2	WIN	SAFE	BTM2	BTM2	BTM3	BTM3	VOID	
Real	SAFE	WIN	SAFE	SAFE	BTM2	SAFE	WIN	SAFE	SAFE	BTM3	SAFE	VOID	JURY	
Pumkin	SAFE	BTM3	WIN	WIN	WIN	WIN	SAFE	SAFE	SAFE	SAFE	VOID		JURY	
Toasteee	SAFE	BTM2	WIN	WIN	WIN	WIN	BTM3	WIN	SAFE	VOID^{*}			JURY	
Brandi C.	BTM2	WIN	SAFE	BTM2	BTM3	BTM3	WIN	SAFE	BTM3	VOID				
The Entertainer	SAFE	SAFE	WIN	WIN	WIN	WIN	SAFE	BTM3	WIN	VOID			JURY	
Heather	SAFE	SAFE	WIN	WIN	WIN	WIN	SAFE	SAFE	VOID				JURY	
12 Pack	SAFE	SAFE	WIN	WIN	WIN	WIN	SAFE	VOID					JURY	
Rodeo	SAFE	SAFE	WIN	WIN	WIN	WIN	VOID							
Chance	SAFE	WIN	SAFE	SAFE	SAFE	VOID								
Destiney	SAFE	WIN	SAFE	BTM3	VOID									
Mr. Boston	SAFE	WIN	BTM3	VOID										
Heat	SAFE	WIN	VOID											
Nibblz	BTM3	VOID												
Midget Mac	VOID													

Teams
The contestant was chosen to be on the Gold Team by Hoopz.
The contestant was chosen to be on the Green Team by Whiteboy.
Team captains are noted by bold text.

Competition
The contestant won the competition.
The contestant was Paymaster.
The contestant was part of the jury.
The contestant was on the winning team and was safe.
The contestant did not win the challenge, but was not chosen to be in the Bottom 3.
The contestant was at risk of not being picked for a team or they were voted into the Bottom 3, but was not eliminated.
The contestant was eliminated, thus their check was voided.
The contestant was last in the challenge and was automatically eliminated.
The contestant quit the competition.
Notes
Episode 1 — The team captains (Hoopz and Whiteboy) were the only ones who were safe from elimination.
Episode 7 — Craig announced that there would not be any more teams.
Episode 10 — The contestant coming in last place in the challenge (The Entertainer) was automatically eliminated.
Episode 10 — Toastee was voted into the Bottom 3, after Brandi C. quit the competition.^{^*}
Episode 12 — This was a recap episode
Episode 13 — Brandi C. would have been part of the jury, but by quitting she left the competition completely.

== Episodes ==
=== A Very 'Short Trip' ===
First aired July 6, 2008

The 17 contestants competing for the ultimate cash prize of $250,000 arrive at a beach where they must jump into the water to get to shore. Immediately, Midget Mac is targeted for being unable to get off the boat because he is unable to swim, but 12 Pack lifts him up and puts him safely on the beach. The contestants then walk up a beach where they find host Craig Jackson. They are told to run into the mansion and make themselves comfortable. Upon entering the mansion, alliances start to form. Destiney, Heather, Heat and 12 Pack form an alliance and old friends Whiteboy, Chance, and Real do the same. Megan and Brandi C. soon form an alliance, and hide Mr. Boston's bed, not wanting him in their room because they think he is "a disgusting pervert". Mr. Boston later finds the bed that Megan and Brandi C. hid from him. Next Jackson calls them up one by one and asks them what they would do if they won the grand prize money of $250,000. After they all answer, he signs the check with their name on it for that amount. Jackson then tells the contestants that they must dress in a bikini for their challenge. Hoopz and the other women in the house ask Midget Mac why he has not dressed in a bikini yet, and he says he refuses to. Hoopz suggests it is because he is too insecure, and Midget Mac becomes angry and calls her a "hoe", which angers both the men and women in the house. Once outside, the challenge is revealed that contestants must get the most money from a money machine. Midget Mac and Chance choose not to participate in the challenge. The first two to compete, Megan and Brandi C., are disqualified for grabbing money off the floor of the machine.

Place	Contestant
1	Hoopz
2	Whiteboy
3	Destiney
4-13	Rest of the Cast
14	Brandi C. Megan
16	Chance; Midget Mac

The contestant won the challenge and became the Gold Team captain.
The contestant placed second in the challenge and became the Green Team captain.
The contestant did not win the challenge.
The contestant was disqualified.
The contestant chose not to participate in the challenge.

After everyone competes, the top 3 "money grabbers" are revealed as Hoopz, Destiney, and Whiteboy. Hoopz grabbed the most money, making her Gold Team captain, and Whiteboy places second, making him the Green Team captain. Once back inside the house, Rodeo attempts to convince Midget Mac to apologize to Hoopz for calling her a hoe and other degrading names, but to no avail. Meanwhile, contestants attempt to make deals to remain in the competition. Mr. Boston approaches Whiteboy and says that they should remain allies because they are both Jewish. At the elimination ceremony, Jackson reveals that Hoopz and Whiteboy will take turns choosing contestants "dodgeball style". After many rounds of selecting contestants, Hoopz has Rodeo, 12 Pack, The Entertainer, Heather, Toastee, and Pumkin on her team and Whiteboy has Chance, Real, Mr. Boston, Heat, Destiney, and Megan on his team. Heat is unhappy to be on Whiteboy's team, because he wanted to be on the same team with 12 Pack. The bottom three were Brandi C, Midget Mac, and Nibblz. Nibblz and Brandi C. try to show off their strength by giving speeches and doing push-ups. Brandi C. hurts her ankle while attempting the push-ups, while Nibblz does ten perfect ones. Midget Mac refuses to give a speech or show his strengths. Hoopz then picks Nibblz, because she's more physically strong, leaving Whiteboy with the final decision of whom to choose last. He ends up choosing Brandi C., saying he would rather have someone mentally stable. Midget Mac therefore is not chosen by Hoopz or Whiteboy, being the first eliminated and having his check voided.

- Challenge: Money Booth
- Challenge Winners: Hoopz (1st), Whiteboy (2nd)
- Gold Team: Hoopz, Rodeo, 12 Pack, The Entertainer, Heather, Toastee, Pumkin, Nibblz
- Green Team: Whiteboy, Chance, Real, Mr. Boston, Heat, Destiney, Megan, Brandi C.
- Bottom 3: Brandi C., Midget Mac, Nibblz
- Eliminated: Midget Mac

Reason For Elimination

- **Midget Mac** - Midget Mac was rude to Hoopz, refused to participate in the money grabbing challenge, and didn't bother to give a speech on why he should be picked.

=== Only the Weak Survive ===
First aired July 13, 2008

The cell phones the teams received by Craig at the previous elimination ceremony rang with the message that they must choose different captains. Chance insists on being the captain for the Green team, while the Gold team unanimously selects Rodeo. Destiney witnesses the Green team poorly strategizing, and asks if she can step up as captain, and then they make her the captain instead of Chance. The challenge was a reference to the event on Flavor of Love 2, when H-Town and Saaphyri were involved in a fist fight over a bed. The bed was to be suspended over water, and when someone steps over a certain line, one half of the bed drops. The object was to use giant sticks to knock the opponent off the bed. If a contestant grabs onto the cables, or their flower stick gets knocked into the water, the contestant will be disqualified and the opposing contestant gets a point. The team that received the most points out of five rounds would be crowned the winning team. Whiteboy and 12 Pack battle, and Whiteboy wins after 12 Pack is disqualified for grabbing onto a cable, giving the Green Team the first point. The Entertainer and Heat are up next, where The Entertainer knocks Heat's stick out of his hands which results in a disqualification. The Gold team therefore ties with the Green team. Real and Hoopz battle next, and Hoopz ends up victorious although Real states it was because he did not want to harm a girl and he realizes he has feelings for Hoopz. Rodeo and Chance were next to compete, and Rodeo got her head stuck in the wires, choking her, and instead of continuing to beat her, Chance freed Rodeo. Chance still receives the point for his team and the Green team was a point away from winning. The next two were chosen as Mr. Boston and Nibblz. Mr. Boston won the match, much to the dismay of Nibblz and her team, giving the Green team the win.

Round	Match Up	Winner
1	12 Pack vs. Whiteboy	Whiteboy
2	The Entertainer vs. Heat	The Entertainer
3	Hoopz vs. Real	Hoopz
4	Chance vs. Rodeo	Chance
5	Mr. Boston vs. Nibblz	Mr. Boston

The contestant won a point for the Green Team.
The contestant won a point for the Gold Team.

In the vault, The Gold team selects Pumkin, Nibblz, and Toastee as the bottom three because of their apparent weakness. Destiney, as the captain of the winning team, became the first Paymaster. Before meeting with Destiney, Pumkin and Toastee form an alliance in hope of eliminating Nibblz. The four go on a power-outing, and watch a Mexican dance ensemble perform. They decide to join in with the dancing and while dancing along, Toastee pretends to trip and hurt her ankle severely, and she begins to cry hysterically, even asking for medical attention. Destiney chooses Pumkin for the one-on-one time. Destiney asks Pumkin why she had gained weight after Flavor of Love. So Pumkin, wanting to make Destiney to feel bad for her and feel like she's weak, makes up the story that she has an eating disorder and begins to cry. At the elimination ceremony, Destiney, believing Pumkin was weak, saves her leaving the bottom two as Nibblz and Toastee. Coincidentally, this was the same bottom two during Flavor of Love 2, when Toastee was eliminated once Nibblz told Flavor Flav about Toastee's pornography career. Destiney decides that because of Toastee's supposed ankle injury, Nibblz was the biggest threat and voided her check.

- Challenge: Bed Battle
- Winner: Green Team
- Pay Master: Destiney
- Bottom 3: Nibblz, Pumkin, Toastee
- Eliminated: Nibblz

Reason For Elimination

- **Nibblz** - Destiney believed that Nibblz would be more of a threat to her than Toastee or Pumkin. Also, Toastee and Pumkin made a deal with Destiney to save her if she ends up in the bottom three.

=== Heat's a Crowd ===
First aired July 20, 2008

Craig sends the contestants a message informing them to choose new captains, and hinting at the idea that the challenge would involve using their mouths. Because Mr. Boston scored the winning point for the Green Team at the previous challenge, he was chosen as captain while the Gold Team chooses with The Entertainer. The teams also had to pair up their members. Expecting the challenge to consist of gross foods they would have to eat, the Green Team paired up weak people with strong people so that every pair would earn a point. However, they were surprised to find the challenge was a reference to the event in which New York and Flavor Flav shared a long, steamy kiss at dinner. Chance, being paired with Mr. Boston, immediately said he would not compete in the challenge. Heather strategized and began teasing Chance, saying a picture of the kiss would pop up on TMZ, and Chance fell for it leading to the Green Team's disqualification. Other members of the Green Team scolded Chance for refusing to lock lips with Mr. Boston for just one second, but his brother, Real, supported the decision. Heat was angry that Chance did not kiss Mr. Boston so he threw a towel at Chance. Chance threatened to "kick Heat's ass". Heat and Chance got into a heated argument and Destiney defends Heat. Chance and Destiney then argued and when Heat fails to support his "girlfriend" when she was defending him, she said she was done with Heat and almost immediately moves on to The Entertainer. Meanwhile, Heather and 12 Pack's relationship took a turn when 12 Pack begins to flirt with Megan, saying that Megan is a "nine and one-half out of ten" and that she's very pretty and cute. Megan, wanting Heather and 12 Pack's alliance to further part, makes sure Heather sees 12 Pack flirting with her. As a result, Heather loses all trust with 12 Pack. At the vault, the Green Team was split while voting and did not make a decision for the bottom three within the 15 minute time limit. Therefore, as captain of the Gold Team, The Entertainer was granted the ability to choose the bottom three. He chose Megan, because she was a manipulator and was trying to separate his alliance by alienating Heather and 12 Pack, Heat, because he feared Destiney might still like him, and Mr. Boston, for being "smarter than he looks". His decisions infuriate his team because he could have put stronger players, particularly Whiteboy, in the box. The four were given a chance to talk before eliminations at lunch on the beach, where Mr. Boston pretended to vomit in hopes of looking weak. The Entertainer lashed out at Megan for starting trouble between 12 Pack and Heather, and she got teary-eyed and defended herself saying that she's just misunderstood. The Entertainer was certain on sending Megan home for personal reasons, but also contemplated sending Heat home for threatening his potential romance with Destiney. Megan said in her interview that she knew The Entertainer was going to send her home and that "It's obviously not the smartest decision, but he's obviously not the smartest guy." At the elimination ceremony, when The Entertainer asked who they felt should be sent home, Heat said Megan should leave and Megan joked she wanted Mr. Boston to stay, because she felt an attraction to him. Both Mr. Boston and Megan want Heat to leave because Mr. Boston is now in an alliance with Megan and Brandi C. Mr. Boston received his check first, and The Entertainer called Heat to get his check, only to tell him he was being eliminated because of his romance with Destiney. Megan was saved, and Heat had his check voided.

- Challenge: The Kiss Off
- Winner: Gold Team
- Pay Master: The Entertainer
- Bottom 3: Heat, Megan, Mr. Boston
- Eliminated: Heat

Reason For Elimination

- **Heat** - The Entertainer eliminated Heat due to Heat's past relationship with Destiney, with whom Entertainer was currently seeing.

=== Bamboozlin' Gone Bad ===
First aired July 27, 2008

At the start of the episode, 12 Pack proposes a plan to get rid of Whiteboy to Megan, Brandi C., and Mr. Boston. Destiney, Megan, Brandi C., and Mr. Boston were to throw the challenge, allowing the Gold Team to win and then they were to vote Whiteboy in the strongbox. Craig sent the teams a message telling them that the challenges would be a test of teamwork, and that they would have to launch their team to victory. 12 Pack was selected as captain for the Gold Team and Chance for the Green Team. The challenge, "Chicken-A-Pult" was a reference to the event in which Hottie served Flavor Flav's mother a raw chicken which she cooked in a microwave during Flavor of Love. The teams had to construct the catapult, then launch the raw chickens and catch five of them to win. The builders were Pumkin, Toastee, and 12 Pack on the Gold Team and Megan, Chance, and Mr. Boston on the Green Team. Megan and Mr. Boston followed through with the plan to "throw the challenge", allowing the Gold Team to finish the building first. Rodeo and The Entertainer catch the first chicken for the Gold Team. Then, Hoopz and Heather catch two more chickens. The Green Team finally finishes building their catapult, and instantly Real and Whiteboy catch a chicken. Rodeo and The Entertainer then catch another chicken for the Gold Team. Real and Whiteboy began to fight hard to stay in the challenge, and catch who more chickens. The score is 4-3 with the Gold Team winning. Rodeo gets smacked in the head with one of the chickens and Destiney is hit on her arm. Through all the injuries, Hoopz and Heather catch the fifth and final chicken for the Gold Team and win the challenge. Whiteboy confronted Megan after the challenge and insisted his strength was needed for the Green Team to be successful. Megan agreed, but had Whiteboy promise her safety from future vault meetings and in return Megan and Brandi C. would save him. In the vault, Destiney, Brandi C., and Mr. Boston were immediately nominated for the bottom three. Destiney and Brandi C. put their checks in the strongbox without a fight, figuring that they were safe because of their weakness, while Mr. Boston fought hard to save his check for the 15 minute period so 12 Pack could put another check in the box instead. After seeing Mr. Boston's attempts to save his check, everybody else re-voted and Mr. Boston was unanimously voted into the box again. Mr. Boston clashes with the Stallionares, and soon Whiteboy and Chance were about to "kill him", but Craig stopped them with saying "no physicality." With only 53 seconds left, Mr. Boston continued to try hard to keep his check from going into the box, but Whiteboy, Chance, and Real forced it in with only 53 seconds left. Mr. Boston screamed at Brandi C. and Megan for betraying him and he begins to cry outside. At the power outing, 12 Pack and the bottom three had lunch together. 12 Pack tried to comprehend why Whiteboy did not go in the box, but was displeased with the answers they gave him. Mr. Boston again emotionally broke down during one-on-one time with 12 Pack. The Gold Team requests that 12 Pack sends Destiney home, but he is skeptical because of his alliance with her. Pumkin and Toastee are angry that he wants to save Destiney, and the Gold Team begins to fall apart because they say that their input means nothing. At the elimination ceremony, Brandi C. tells everybody that she and Mr. Boston threw the challenge, much to the displeasure of the Green Team. 12 Pack first chooses Destiney to be safe from elimination because of their alliance. He then gives Brandi C. her check, and Mr. Boston's check is voided. However, he leaves without his check.

- Challenge: Chicken-A-Pult
- Winner: Gold Team
- Pay Master: 12 Pack
- Bottom 3: Brandi C., Destiney, Mr. Boston
- Eliminated: Mr. Boston

Reason For Elimination

- **Mr. Boston** - 12 Pack chose Brandi C. over Mr. Boston because he felt that Brandi was "totally useless" in competition, and thus, it's better to keep a weak player on the opposing team. Also, 12 Pack was in an alliance with Destiney, and thus, had given his word that he would not eliminate her.

=== Cry Me a River ===
First aired August 3, 2008

Craig sends the contestants a message saying that this challenge will be about crying. The new team captains are Real for the Green Team, and Toastee for the Gold Team. When the contestants get to the next location Craig announces that they will be taking part in the Crying Game. The challenge is based on all the Of Love shows where the contestants cry. Since the Gold team has seven people compared to the Green Team, who has six, Toastee has Hoopz sit out for her inability to get emotional. The teams may use five items to help them produce tears (hot sauce, cayenne pepper, tweezers, onions, and a cigar), leaving one person to cry naturally on each team. They will gain a point for their team when their tears pass the black line marked under their nose. Pumkin, unaware of what cayenne peppers are, throws cayenne pepper in her eyes, which burn her eyes and she instantly begins to cry, giving the Gold Team the first point. Heather finds success with the onions giving the Gold Team another point. The Entertainer cries next with the use of the tweezers. Chance gets the first point for the Green Team for sticking a cigar in his eyes. 12 Pack throws hot sauce in his eyes gets another point for the Gold Team. Toastee gets little results with the cigar smoke, so she gives 12 Pack permission to physically assault her, slapping her across the face, and sure enough, it works and she begins to cry. The Gold Team is one point away from winning. Destiney then cries and Megan is soon able to cry with help from Destiney. Whiteboy cries next. Real has a lot of trouble producing tears. The last three Brandi C. and Real for the Green Team and Rodeo for the Gold Team, Brandi C., and Rodeo must cry naturally. Brandi C., desperate for a tear, tries everything and Whiteboy suggests gagging herself with her finger to make herself cry, and she begins to tear up. Rodeo begins to tear up after thinking about her son, who is miles away and gets the tear across the line right before Brandi and Real, making the Gold Team win again.

Place	Contestant
1	Pumkin
2	Heather
3	The Entertainer
4	Chance
5	12 Pack
6	Destiney
7	Toastee
8	Megan
9	Whiteboy
10	Rodeo
12	Brandi C.
12	Real

The contestant won a point for the Gold Team.
The contestant won a point for the Green Team.
The contestant failed to gain a point for their team.

Destiney knows that she's the next target and she cries in her room. The Entertainer and her plan to pretend they're in a fight to hopefully throw off the target on Destiney's back, but to no avail, as all the other contestants were partying and getting drunk, so they did not even notice. In the vault, Destiney is voted into the box along with Brandi C., for not being able to cry. Real volunteers to put his check in the strongbox for his poor performance at the challenge. On the power outing, Toastee and the bottom three go scuba-diving and Real injures himself when he thought he saw sharks in the water. Brandi C. thinks Real is faking the injury to look weak. Destiney reminds Toastee that she saved her awhile back and that Pumkin and her promised they'd have her back the next time. Real gets the one-on-one time and promises Toastee that he and the rest of the Stallionare alliance would protect her in future eliminations if she saves him. Before elimination, Real goes over to Pumkin and says if he goes home, he will cry. Meanwhile, The Entertainer vows if Toastee gets rid of Destiney, he'll "make her life a living hell." At elimination, Brandi C. is saved first. Toastee calls up Destiney, only to tell her that her check will be voided, because Real was Toastee's "boy". Destiney gets her check voided and says she's going home because "she doesn't play dirty." Destiney gives a kiss to The Entertainer and leaves The Entertainer upset and heartbroken.

- Challenge: The Crying Game
- Winner: Gold Team
- Pay Master: Toastee
- Bottom 3: Brandi C., Destiney, Real
- Eliminated: Destiney

Reason For Elimination

- **Destiney** - Even though she made a deal to Destiney, Toastee eliminated Destiney because Real was part of her alliance.

=== Blonde Leading the Blonde ===
First aired August 10, 2008

Craig tells the contestants that in this next challenge they will be saving more than just their team if they win. At the challenge, the contestants are told that they must save four Midget Macs from the ocean, similar to I Love New York 2, when Buddha saved Midget Mac from drowning in the water hole. The team captains are Pumkin for the Gold Team and Brandi C. for the Green Team. Because the Gold Team has two extra members, Pumkin must select two people to sit out, but she cannot sit out Hoopz because she sat out last time. Pumkin picks Rodeo and The Entertainer to sit out the challenge. The competition starts and 12 Pack and Chance dash towards the water. 12 Pack swims very quickly, but Chance, who is wearing a life jacket, does a doggy paddle. 12 Pack goes to the farthest Midget Mac and begins bringing it back when Chance gets to his, which is the second-farthest. They get to the shore and the rest of their team can now put the Macs on a stretcher and bring them behind their team lines. After 12 Pack returns Heather goes for the second farthest Midget Mac. Once Chance finally returns, Megan goes next. Whiteboy and the other guys are aroused when Megan, who is wearing a red bikini, begins to run out into the ocean to save the second closest Midget Mac. Brandi C. says Megan looks cute and that it's just like Baywatch. Megan says she's upset that she has to swim so fast to make up for Chance. Next, Toastee and Pumkin go together to the closest one, which is submerged underwater. It is attached by a clip which Toastee cannot undo, but Pumkin refuses to help her because she's too afraid, and they waste a lot of time. Megan returns and Whiteboy goes out for the farthest Midget Mac. Whiteboy returns, and Real and Brandi C. go together to their closest and final Mac. Toastee and Pumkin finally get their Midget Mac free and start bringing him to shore as he falls apart. Hoopz goes for the second closest Mac and returns before Brandi C. and Real get theirs back meaning the Gold Team wins. After the challenge Megan tries to convince Pumkin that she needs to eliminate one of the Stallionaires, because the Green Team has only five members meaning that Brandi C., Megan, and one of the Stallionare will be put in the strongbox. Pumkin as Paymaster is unsure if she should break her alliance with the Stallionaires or not. In the vault, Megan and Brandi C. are voted into the box and Chance volunteers to put his check in the box for his poor performance. At their power outing with Pumkin, they go to a spa, but Chance hardly talks and acts like he'd rather be anywhere else, stating that since him and Pumkin are already in alliance he does not need to prove himself. When Megan calls him out for not trying to save his self, he yells at her. Megan realizes that she's in danger of going home and she must find a way to save herself. Pumkin is then given time to spend one-on-one and chooses Megan because she had wanted to tell Pumkin something in private. Megan tells Pumkin that the Stallionares will only use Toastee and her as sacrifices later in the game because they are at the bottom of the chain in their alliance. Megan also says that she is the only one that has not been captain on her team, so if Megan becomes captain next challenge and the Green Team wins, Megan will be Paymaster and Pumkin will be saved. Pumkin is unsure if the Stallionare Alliance will allow Megan to become captain and voices her opinion to Megan. Megan replies that if someone else is captain, Megan and Brandi C. will throw the challenge and the Gold Team will win, saving Pumkin. Megan also tells her that Megan, Brandi C., Pumkin, and Toastee can form a new "Secret Alliance" to get the other alliances out. Pumkin is very impressed with Megan's offers, because they guarantee her safety. Back at the house, Hoopz tries to convince Pumkin to get rid of Megan because she is manipulative, and Hoopz thinks Megan will easily control Pumkin. Pumkin considers Hoopz's reasoning because Pumkin and Megan do not like each other ever since Pumkin stated she wanted a boob-job if she won the money and Megan said in front of everybody "Saggy boobs suck." At elimination, Pumkin gives her first check to Brandi C., for her weakness. Then she calls up Megan, and Chance believes that Pumkin's going to tell her she's going home. Pumkin states every reason she does not like Megan and why she should not trust her, and then gives her the check, thus eliminating Chance. 12 Pack is happy someone finally took out a Stallionaire, but Hoopz, Whiteboy, Real and Chance freak out and get very upset, spewing profanity and threats toward Pumkin. Chance gets his check voided and angrily leaves. Pumkin now realizes she's a major target of the Stallionare Alliance.

- Challenge: Save the Mac
- Winner: Gold Team
- Pay Master: Pumkin
- Bottom 3: Brandi C., Chance, Megan
- Eliminated: Chance

Reason For Elimination

- **Chance** - Pumkin wanted to eliminate Megan because she could not get along with her. However, after talking with Megan about a secret alliance, Pumkin decides to keep Megan and eliminate Chance, much to the dismay of the Stallionaire Alliance.

=== The Good, the Bad, and the Confused? ===
First aired August 17, 2008

The episode begins where last episode left off, after Pumkin eliminated Chance, and Real angrily warns her, "she's going next." Heather, 12 Pack, and The Entertainer praise Pumkin for getting rid of Chance and invite her and Toastee into their "Gold Team Alliance". Whiteboy and Megan flirt outside, and begin to form crushes on each other. They decide that they will have each other's backs. Whiteboy, Real, and Hoopz realize they are no longer the majority alliance in the house and decide it's time for the Green Team to step up. The house is now split into three alliances, The Gold Team Alliance, The Stallionare Alliance, and the "Secret Alliance" which nobody knows about. In the Gold Team Alliance is 12 Pack, Heather, The Entertainer, Pumkin, and Toastee. The Stallionare Alliance is Whiteboy, Real, Rodeo, and Hoopz. The Secret Alliance ironically contains Megan, Brandi C., Pumkin, and Toastee because Megan and Brandi C., who are now very close best friends, don't like Pumkin and Toastee and vice versa. Rodeo is trying to be on good terms with the Gold Team Alliance but sways towards the Stallionare Alliance. In this week's challenge, the Gold Team chooses Heather to be captain, since she has never been one. Megan tries to persuade the Green Team to allow her to be captain as planned. Whiteboy and Real are skeptical, but Megan convinces them. They make her swear on The Bible that she will eliminate who they want, and Megan agrees. Megan later says "I do what I want to do." The teams hit the streets of Mexico to compete in a worldly challenge of cuisine, based on places the "of Love" contestants visited on their shows. The stops are Los Angeles, Las Vegas, France, and Jamaica. Three members of the Gold team must sit out, since there are only four members of the Green team left. Heather chooses Hoopz, Pumkin and herself to sit out. In this challenge, two members of one team must pull a miniature tour bus, with two other members on board, hitting all of the stops. The teams must eat all of the food at each stop before proceeding onto the next one. The first team to consume all of the food and reach the finish line wins. On the Gold Team, 12 Pack and The Entertainer pull, while Toastee and Rodeo ride. On the Green Team, Real and Whiteboy pull, while Brandi C. and Megan ride. Before the challenge began, Rodeo and Hoopz had a plan to throw the challenge, but since Hoopz must sit out, Rodeo must do it on her own. The Green team moves rather quickly during the challenge, while Rodeo takes her time eating, and even The Entertainer has a hard time eating some of the food. In the end, the Green team wins the challenge by a long shot. Hoopz congratulates the Green Team for winning and Heather yells at Hoopz for her betrayal and The Entertainer sticks up for Heather and screams at Hoopz. Hoopz is about to hit him, until Real physically removes her away from The Entertainer. Megan becomes Paymaster, and in the vault, the Gold Team chooses Rodeo and Hoopz to go into the strongbox for their betrayal of the Gold Team, and Toastee voluntary puts herself in, figuring she's safe because of her new Secret Alliance with Megan. On the power outing, they take a boat down the river. Megan takes the opportunity to mess with Rodeo, because she knows Rodeo will do whatever she tells her to do. She wants to make Rodeo feel guilty because earlier, Rodeo plotted against Megan and "trash-talked" her. She makes Rodeo try to ride some wild horses they saw while they were rafting down the river, and when Rodeo fails to do so, Megan sarcastically says that now she'll never keep Rodeo, and Rodeo freaks out. When they arrive at lunch, Megan tells the girls that she will not be making the decisions, her dog, Lily, would. So instead of convincing her why they should stay, Megan makes the three talk to Lily instead. Both Hoopz and Toastee pretend to talk to Lily, but Rodeo emotionally tells Lily if they keep her, she'd do whatever to keep Megan in the game, and says that if she wins she will share the money with Megan. Rodeo repeatedly apologizes to Megan. Megan, wanting to embarrass Rodeo, asks her "For what?" every time Rodeo says she's sorry, knowing that Rodeo does not want to admit she was talking about her. Megan then says she's putting them through the final test. She asks each contestant why they should not be sent home. Hoopz says she's the most loyal in the house. Megan responds by saying, "So your saying I should keep you because you're loyal to other people?" Hoopz tells Megan that she can be loyal to her if they come to that agreement. Megan then interviews "Hoopz has been loyal to Whiteboy, and Real, and Chance this whole time. It doesn't have anything to do with me though. I believe she's loyal to them, but there's no like connection. (laughs) So why the f**k do I care? (laughs)" Megan chooses to spend the one-on-one time with Rodeo. Rodeo tries to win her over, still apologizing and even hugging her, but nothing works: It's only a chance for Megan to make Rodeo feel bad for all of the things she has said behind Megan's back. Megan tells Rodeo that she thinks her apologies are fake because if Rodeo's team would've won the challenge today, Rodeo would not apologize for the things she said. Rodeo stumbles over what Megan said and then interview that she needs the money the most because she only has $100 left. Pumkin and Brandi C. try to convince Megan to get rid of Hoopz, saying that if they do not eliminate her now, she'll go to the finale. Megan, however, wants to be on good terms with Whiteboy, and thinks that eliminating Hoopz will only get her eliminated. She figures that eliminating Rodeo would be the smartest thing to do for herself, because Rodeo had no true alliance so no one would want her gone for eliminating her. At elimination, Megan gives Toastee her check first, insulting her before and afterwards, only because she does not want anyone to know about the Secret Alliance. Ultimately, Megan gives Hoopz her check because she does not want to cause turmoil between Whiteboy and his alliance. Megan tells Rodeo that she used to be scared of her, but that she is not scared of her anymore and voids her check. Hoopz gets her check and stands next to the Green team, stating that that was her true team. The episode ends with Craig telling them that there will be no more teams for the rest of the game; all the challenges will be individual.

- Challenge: Road Trip Drag
- Winner: Green Team
- Pay Master: Megan
- Bottom 3: Hoopz, Rodeo, Toastee
- Eliminated: Rodeo

Reason For Elimination

- **Rodeo** - Since Toastee was part of her secret alliance and eliminating Hoopz would mean that the Stallionaire Alliance would come after her, Megan decides to eliminate Rodeo as she been switching alliance to keep herself in the game.

=== Watch Your Back ===
First aired August 24, 2008

The episode opens with the Secret Alliance discussing that they will try to take out the Stallionares. Megan says that even though she's in the Secret Alliance with Brandi C., Pumkin, and Toastee, she wants to be in the Stallionare Alliance because they can protect her even more, so her targets will be the Gold Team Alliance members. Craig tells the contestants they are going to compete in a backstabbing contest, which Craig said is based on I Love Money for its oral routine of backstabbing. They play back clips of how Megan tried to alienate Heather and 12 Pack from each other, how 12 Pack got Mr. Boston, Megan, and Brandi C. to throw the challenge, how Megan and Brandi C. betrayed Mr. Boston, how Pumkin and Toastee got Nibblz eliminated, and how Toastee eliminated Destiney after promising not to eliminate her. Craig explains that each contestant has a dummy which represents themselves. The dummies have their backs facing towards the contestants, however, because they will be throwing daggers into the dummies backs. Each person will take a turn throwing a dagger, one at a time, until everyone has gone. When a dummy has three daggers in its back, the corresponding person loses the challenge. The first person to lose the challenge, the "dead-last loser", will have his or her check automatically put into the strongbox. The last person standing will become Paymaster. Before the challenge begins, the other members in the Secret Alliance decide to take out the Stallionare Alliance in the challenge, but Megan decides she'll throw her daggers at members of the Gold Team Alliance to try to earn the trust of the Stallionare Alliance. Whiteboy was the first person losing the challenge after Brandi C., 12 Pack, and Pumkin throw their daggers in his dummy. Whiteboy states that he now has Megan's back and vice versa because she was trying to protect him by going after The Entertainer, Heather, and 12 Pack. The Entertainer loses next, followed by Heather, Pumkin, Megan, Hoopz, and Brandi C. It was down to 12 Pack, Real, and Toastee; each with two daggers in their backs. Real eliminated 12 Pack, and in return, 12 Pack eliminated Real, making Toastee the winner and Paymaster.

Names	1	2	3	4	5	6	7
Toastee	Hoopz	?	?	Hoopz	Hoopz	**Hoopz**	Winner
Real	**Entertainer**	?	**Entertainer**	**Pumkin**	Pumkin	?	**12 Pack**
12 Pack	**Whiteboy**	**Brandi C.**	**Megan**	**Megan**	Megan	**Brandi C.**	**Real**
Brandi C.	**Whiteboy**	?	?	Real	Real	**12 Pack**	
Hoopz	Entertainer	**Entertainer**	**Pumkin**	**Heather**	Toastee	-	
Megan	Entertainer	**Heather**	**Heather**	?	12 Pack		
Pumkin	**Whiteboy**	?	?	Real	Real		
Heather	Whiteboy	?	**Toastee**	-			
The Entertainer	**Hoopz**	Brandi C.	**Brandi C.**				
Whiteboy	-						

The table above notes the person each contestant aimed for that round of the challenge. Names in bold denote that they successfully hit their target. A pink background denotes being hit that round and a red background denotes being eliminated that round. A hyphen denotes someone who did not participate that round due to be eliminated and a question mark denotes that the person participated in that round, but their target was not shown. Toastee did not participate in the final round, but won the challenge by process of elimination.

The contestant won the challenge and became Paymaster.
The contestant lost the challenge, but did not finish in last place.
The contestant finished in last place, and their check was automatically placed in the strong box.

On their way back to their house, Whiteboy tells his alliance that his new Stallionare Alliance contains, himself, Real, Hoopz, and Megan. The Secret Alliance scolds Megan for not going after the Stallionares, and they tell her that they are going to get rid of Whiteboy. Megan says she needs to think of a plan to save Whiteboy, because they promised each other they would save each other. 12 Pack talks to Toastee, giving her his word that he will protect her. Meanwhile, Megan puts her new plan into action and tells Whiteboy, Real, and Hoopz that Pumkin controls Toastee; whatever Pumkin's decision is Toastee's decision. She tells them to talk to Pumkin and tell her that they will let her and Toastee be in their Stallionare Alliance if Toastee does not send home Whiteboy. Real goes and apologizes to Pumkin for the threats he made towards her, Pumkin and Toastee now go talk to Whiteboy, Hoopz, and Real. Whiteboy and Pumkin make the deal, and now they are back in the Stallionare Alliance. 12 Pack and Megan are talking, and 12 Pack tells Megan to vote him into the strongbox, because he wants to go on the powerouting with Whiteboy to make sure he does not save himself. The next day, Craig tells the contestants that everyone but the Paymaster must go into the vault to decide whose checks will be voted into the strongbox. There were no votes for Brandi C., Megan, or Pumkin, only one vote each for Heather and Hoopz, and two votes for Real. 12 Pack and The Entertainer each had six votes so their checks were put into the strongbox. Afterwards, Brandi C. tries to convince Megan that Toastee needs to get rid of Whiteboy. Megan's stubborn and says she wants 12 Pack to go home. The four of them go on the power outing, only to have a medicine woman spit on them for a "soul cleansing". Meanwhile, Megan is still trying to convince Brandi C. and Pumkin to keep Whiteboy in the game, much to their displeasure, to which Brandi states, "This is 'I Love Money' not 'I Love Whiteboy'." Megan tells them if Toastee gets rid of 12 Pack, Heather and Entertainer would still target Whiteboy while Hoopz, Real and Whiteboy would target the Entertainer, more importantly, meaning nobody would target their Secret Alliance. Pumkin and Brandi C. decide that does makes sense and decide to target 12 Pack. At lunch, Whiteboy, Entertainer and 12 Pack get in a fight shortly after they arrive, completely disagreeing with each other's quips. 12 Packs gets the one-on-one with Toastee and he tells her if she takes out Whiteboy, he'll save her from the Stallionaires next time around. At elimination, Toastee gives the first check to The Entertainer, stating he's annoying and out of the three of them, he's not a threat. Toastee calls up 12 Pack and she tells him he always says got everybody's back and she feels like he cannot back up his words and she cannot trust him. A shocked, and previously confident, 12 Pack gets his check voided and said if he could change anything, he would have taken out Toastee earlier in the challenge. Craig gives everybody a reality check saying if you're in the box, you are not safe.

- Challenge: The Backstabber
- Winner/Pay Master: Toastee
- Loser: Whiteboy
- Bottom 3: 12 Pack, The Entertainer, Whiteboy
- Eliminated: 12 Pack

Reason For Elimination

- **12 Pack** - Toastee did not believe 12 Pack could keep his word to keep her safe, and believed he had been giving everyone that same promise, and it was impossible for him to keep his promise to everyone.

=== Drunk with Power ===
First aired August 31, 2008

The remaining 9 contestants wake up the following morning after 12 Pack's elimination the previous night. Heather seems very distant from her alliance with The Entertainer now that 12 Pack was eliminated, and everyone seems to notice. They get a message from Craig saying that they have another challenge that day, and that they will be getting uniforms. The contestants put on their uniforms and to the field where they find that their next challenge is the Spit Olympics, based on Pumkin's famous spit fight with New York on Flavor of Love. The contestants will test their spitting skills with distance, height, and accuracy. The first event requires the contestants to run and spit as far as they can, and their colored spit will be measured and marked with a flag. The Entertainer knows he has to win this challenge because he knows everybody in the house wants him gone and this is his only chance to prevent this from happening. Megan does the worse and because her spit was the closest, she was out and was automatically put in the box. The next event requires the remaining contestants to run and spit vertically and the three people with the highest spits move on to the final event, which ends up being Whiteboy, Real and Entertainer. The final event requires the boys to run to a target and spit on and whoever has the most points becomes Paymaster. The Entertainer hits all but one target and he confidently thinks he'll be Pay Master. Whiteboy barely hits any and Real hits almost all the targets and in the end, Entertainer becomes Paymaster.

Rank	Long Spit	High Spit	Accuracy Spit
1	The Entertainer (18' 6.5")	The Entertainer (14' 10.5")	The Entertainer (110 pts.)
2	Whiteboy (18' 5")	Whiteboy (14' 9.5")	Real (100 pts.)
3	Real (18' 2")	Real (14' 8")	Whiteboy (95 pts.)
4	Heather (14' 10")	Hoopz (14')	
5	Pumkin (12' 4")	Heather (13' 10")	
6	Hoopz (9' 6")	Pumkin (11' 2")	
7	Brandi C. (7' 11")		
8	Toastee (6' 3")		
9	Megan (5' 9")		

The contestant won the challenge and became Paymaster.
The contestant lost the challenge, but did not finish in last place.
The contestant finished in last place, and their check was automatically placed in the strong box.

Entertainer talks to Megan's alliance, and Heather and tells them to vote Real and Hoopz into the box the next day. Entertainer explains he might just get rid of Megan, just to watch Real and Hoopz squirm. Entertainer decides this would be a good time to make peace with Whiteboy, to which Whiteboy states, "I just don't want him that close to me." Whiteboy accepts him in, nevertheless. The secret alliance discover that Entertainer was lying about saving Megan and they made a plan in which Heather and Brandi C. would go in the box so that Megan and Brandi C. turn Entertainer against Heather. In the vault, none of the girls from the secret alliance placed a vote for neither Hoopz nor Real, but instead, Brandi C. and Heather are voted into the box, which makes The Entertainer very angry to know that the girls lied to him, to which he blames it all on Heather. On the power outing, a chef cooks up American food on a grill for them. Entertainer chooses Heather for the one on one. Heather and him continue to argue about the vault fiasco and Heather feels betrayed that The Entertainer, whom she's known since the beginning of the show, is not listening to her and that he is going along with Megan and Brandi C., who cannot be trusted. Megan and Brandi C. give Entertainer a massage at the house and tell him if he gets rid of Heather, no one would care, since she is the most hated person in the house. At elimination, before Entertainer can give anybody their check, the three girls fight, to which everybody else finds amusing (as it felt like an episode of Rock of Love). When order is restored, Brandi is given her check first for being the least of Entertainer's problems. Then he calls up Megan, saying he has every right to send her home, but because she's weak, he does not see her as a threat. Heather gets her check voided and says a black hearted person will win the money, to which they do not deserve.

- Challenge: The Spit Olympics
- Winner/Pay Master: The Entertainer
- Loser: Megan
- Bottom 3: Brandi C., Heather, Megan
- Eliminated: Heather

Reason For Elimination

- **Heather** - The Entertainer felt he couldn't trust Heather anymore.

=== Pole Riders in the Sky ===
First aired September 14, 2008

The episode begins with Real waking up with Hoopz sleeping next to him. Real claims he feels like he can be with Hoopz with the rest of his life and gives her a bouquet of flowers. The next challenge requires the remaining 8 contestants to cling onto stripper poles suspended over water, which is based on the Rock of Love and Flavor of Love girls constant stripping. The first person to fall off will automatically go home while the last person will be Pay Master. Real and Entertainer struggle, but Real climbs back up the pole while The Entertainer falls off and is automatically out of the game. Then Whiteboy starts to struggle and cannot stay on the pole and falls off, then Pumkin cannot get a good position and jumps off, and then Real starts to slide down to the bottom of the pole and climb back up continuously but could not keep climbing up the pole any longer and slides off, not long after Brandi C struggles to find a comfortable position on the pole and slides off. Toastee starts to struggle to find a comfortable position on the pole and tries to hang on longer but because Megan is still on the pole, she decides to jump off. The remaining two people are Hoopz and Megan. Megan maintains her pose while Hoopz starts to feel unsure. Cheered on by Whiteboy and Real, Hoopz climbs higher on the pole and continues to hold her pose. After 40 minutes, Hoopz proceeds to try to convince Megan to go ahead and fall. Hoopz gives Megan her word that she would not be eliminated. Megan falls in the water, making Hoopz the Paymaster. Entertainer says it's been an amazing experience and gets his check voided and leaves.

Rank	Contestant	Time
1	Hoopz	40:00-45:00
2	Megan	40:00-45:00
3	Toastee	15:00
4	Brandi C.	5:34
5	Real	5:18
6	Pumkin	2:37
7	Whiteboy	2:23
8	The Entertainer	1:16

The contestant won the challenge and became Paymaster.
The contestant lost the challenge, but did not finish in last place.
The contestant placed last in the challenge, and their check was automatically voided.

Pumkin and Toastee decided to convince Brandi C. to turn against Megan and vote her into the box, since, with the Entertainer gone, the secret alliance has nobody else to target, leaving them to go against each other. Brandi is upset at what Pumkin and Toastee are telling her, and tells Megan about their plan. Megan declares war. Megan lies to Whiteboy saying Toastee wants him gone, which Toastee denies. Whiteboy does not know whom to believe. The next day in the vault, Whiteboy does not vote at all, not deciding who is right. Real puts himself in the box in order to get closer to Hoopz. Pumkin, Toastee and Real vote Brandi and Megan into the box. Megan is mad at Whiteboy for not voting at all. Hoopz is being advised to eliminate Megan, in spite of giving her word not to, and ruminates over the issue. Before leaving to go on the power outing, Brandi makes a comment to Pumkin and Toastee about them eating a lot and Pumkin screams at her on the stairwell. Megan overhears the fight, rushes to Brandi's defense and a wild food fight ensues. Hoopz, Whiteboy and Real just stand around, enjoying the fight. On the power outing, the four contestants ride horses on the beach. Real is excited because he loves horses. Brandi C. and Megan are scared because they know Hoopz will eliminate one of them and they try to enjoy their final time together while it lasts. Megan tells Hoopz that they do not belong in the box and Pumkin and Toastee do. Hoopz agrees. On the one on one, she talks to Real. Real says he loves her and feels a deep connection with her. He gets on one knee and proposes to her with a ring he got from Chance earlier. Hoopz is shocked and flattered, but feels awkward since she has a boyfriend back at home. She also does not want to be distracted from her main purpose: winning the money. She does not answer him. Back at the house, Hoopz tells Whiteboy about Real's proposal. Whiteboy finds this absolutely hilarious and can barely keep a straight face when Real enters the room. Hoopz still does not have the answer. Upstairs, Brandi C. cries because she knows she and Megan are about to be separated, and Megan comforts her. At elimination, Pumkin is excited because she is certain either Megan or Brandi will go home, and she gets to gloat. Toastee wants Brandi to go home because she's a "coward and a baby". Before Craig lets Hoopz start giving out checks, Brandi C. tearfully stops him right in the middle of his speech and tells him she wants to quit. Craig gives her a chance to think over this impulse but Brandi is sure. She quits and her check is voided. She hugs Megan and leaves, saying no amount of money is worth more than a friend she will have for life. While everyone seems to think Brandi's decision saves Hoopz the trouble of deciding who will leave, Craig informs them that they have to go back to the vault and vote somebody else into the box since there have to be three people up for elimination. Hoopz retains the privilege to send a person home, which would be shown in the next episode.

- Challenge: The Pole Dance
- Winner/Pay Master: Hoopz
- Loser/Eliminated: The Entertainer
- Bottom 3: Megan, Real, Toastee
- Eliminated: Brandi C. (quit), Toastee

Reason For Elimination

- **The Entertainer** - Entertainer came in last place in the challenge.
- **Brandi C.** - Brandi quit to save Megan and could not stand being in the house with Pumkin and Toastee.
- **Toastee** - After Brandi quit, the paymaster still needs to eliminate someone and because there's only two people eligible for elimination, the group (except for the paymaster, Hoopz) have to vote someone else into the box, in which everyone voted for Toastee. Hoopz then eliminates Toastee as she was part of Chance's elimination and that she gave her word to Megan to save her. (Toastee's elimination was not shown until the beginning of the next episode).

=== A Real Dilemma ===
First aired September 21, 2008

Picking up from where episode 10 left off, all the remaining contestants, minus Hoopz, returned to the vault to vote somebody else into the box, because Brandi C. voluntarily quit. Toastee is voted into the box by everyone but Pumkin. Back at elimination, Hoopz saves Real first, as he is still her friend, even if she did say "no" to his proposal. Toastee is eliminated because Hoopz cannot trust her and she thinks she's responsible for Chance's elimination. Toastee gets her check voided and gets mad that Megan got her way and says that she's evil and she cannot believe she did this to her. Real talks to his brother Chance on the phone and talks about Hoopz, and his brother says Whiteboy might be infatuated with her and advises Real to take him out. The next day, it's their next challenge: "You Booze, You Lose", which is based on all the VH1 shows where the contestants get drunk and then pass out. The contestant must spin around in a chair twenty times, then walk on a platform, without stepping on any cups, or it will result in a penalty (-1 each cup stepped on), which will add onto the total time, and then go back on the chair and spin again for another twenty times, then they have to drink a couple glasses of margarita, then spit it in a toilet, then kiss a person (an old lady or old man), and then they cross the finish line. The person with the fastest time will be Pay Master, while the person with the slowest time will automatically be put into the box for elimination. In the end, Hoopz got the fastest time and was Pay Master, again for the 2nd time in a row, which was the first time this has happened, while Pumkin did the worst and was automatically put in the box.

Rank	Contestant	Time
1	Hoopz	4:21
2	Megan	5:04
3	Real	5:30
4	Whiteboy	8:17
5	Pumkin	11:01

The contestant won the challenge and became Paymaster.
The contestant lost the challenge, but did not finish in last place.
The contestant finished in last place and their check was automatically placed in the strong box.

Back at the house, Real tells Hoopz that he claims that he heard Whiteboy called Hoopz the b word (which Real has also learned from Chance), and Hoopz is offended and truly believes it. Hoopz, Real, and Whiteboy talk about the issue and Hoopz still does not believe Whiteboy, and Whiteboy feels hurt and accuses Real of setting him up to eliminate him from their "love triangle." In the vault, nobody wants to vote, so they agree to let Hoopz make the decision on who will join Pumkin in the box. Hoopz picks Megan and Whiteboy. On the power outing, the four contenders go on a yacht ride. Hoopz considers getting rid of Pumkin because she went against the alliance and eliminated Chance. Megan thinks she's safe because Hoopz gave her word last episode, but Hoopz says that was one time only. Pumkin and Megan fight about Chance's elimination. On the one on one, Hoopz picks Whiteboy, wanting to find out more about his side of the story. Whiteboy continues to address that he did not do anything and that Real is setting him up. Hoopz tells him she feels hurt about his comment to her earlier in their conversation that she's a stranger to him. Whiteboy apologized to her and thinks he might be in trouble come elimination time. Before elimination, Real prepares a date with Hoopz, bringing Italy to the backyard, and they talk about her decision. Real continues to blather on and on about why he loves her. Hoopz finally understands what's going on. At elimination, the first person Hoopz saves is Megan, telling her that she now knows Megan's a strong competitor because she got second behind Hoopz in the last two challenges, but that she's been loyal. Then Hoopz calls up Whiteboy and tearfully tells him the comment really hurt her, especially when she's been tight with him since the beginning. Hoopz believes Whiteboy did not really say anything bad behind her back and accepts his apology he gave her, and he's safe. Pumkin thought she was safe because Hoopz and she were friends since Flavor of Love, but Hoopz tells her that going against her alliance and sending home Chance was not trustworthy, making it easier for Hoopz to eliminate her and Pumkin gets her check voided. Coincidentally, every VH1 show Pumkin has been on (Flavor of Love and Charm School), she was eliminated on the episode before the finale; this is the third time it's happened. Real is worried because after Hoopz forgave Whiteboy, he feels like a target. Megan is satisfied because she gotten rid of the "disgusting girls."

- Challenge: You Booze, You Lose
- Winner/Pay Master: Hoopz
- Loser: Pumkin
- Bottom 3: Megan, Pumkin, Whiteboy
- Eliminated: Pumkin

Reason For Elimination

- **Pumkin** - Pumkin went against the Hoopz' alliance before by eliminating Chance, so Hoopz eliminated her to get revenge for Chance.

=== Exclusive Extras Special ===
First aired September 28, 2008

Craig recaps the season's best moments and shows extended scenes and never-before-seen footage, including:

- The romances going on between the cast members.
- Hoopz, Real, Megan, Brandi C, Toastee and Pumkin playing an outrageous game of Truth Or Dare.
- Mr. Boston's unsuccessful attempts to hit on the girls.
- Whiteboy, Hoopz, and The Entertainer's phone calls from hell.
- Brandi C.'s frequent crying.
- Heat describing the other contestants.
- The Entertainer and Pumkin making out.
- The Entertainer kicked in the back of the head by Heather.
- Toastee fighting with her boyfriend on the phone on Valentine's Day after kissing Heather.
- Rodeo's presence in the house.
- Megan and Brandi C's relationship.
- Extended footage of the food fight with Megan and Brandi C. versus Pumkin and Toastee.

=== The Final Four ===
First aired October 5, 2008

It's the final four on I Love Money, and Craig notes their next challenge will be "crazy." When the four contestants arrive to their next location, they see a wide beam supported by a crane, suspended over the water and rocks. This challenge is called "The Krazy Toss" and it's based on Flavor Of Love 2, when Buckeey almost pushed Krazy over the balcony. The contestants will wear a harness and a helmet and will have to carry a Krazy doll over the beam and drop it on a target. Craig tells them they will then have to go back to the starting point and that the event is being timed. Whoever does it in the least time will be Pay Master. The remaining three contestants will go with the Pay Master on a power dinner. The Pay Master will eliminate one person. Megan goes first although she feels she does not have much of a chance because she is afraid of heights. Megan becomes somewhat paralyzed with fear, as well as having a hard time picking up the Krazy doll. Craig tells her if she does not give him a thumbs up and get going, she will be disqualified. Cheered on by Whiteboy, Megan finally gives the sign but does not have her footing. She drops the doll, almost falls off the beam and loses the challenge. Hoopz goes next and impresses the other contestants with the way she grabs the doll, runs right over the beam and tosses the doll off. She forgets she has to come back and stays on the balcony side until she is told she's not done. She finishes in 23 seconds, but says the rules were not made clear. They replay the segment where Craig made the rules perfectly clear. Real goes next. He is also afraid of heights but he manages to get through the challenge in 28 seconds, putting him in second place. Whiteboy wastes no time and finishes in 16 seconds, winning the game.

Rank	Contestant	Time
1	Whiteboy	0:16
2	Hoopz	0:23
3	Real	0:28
4	Megan	Disqualified

The contestant won the challenge and became Paymaster.
The contestant lost the challenge and their check was automatically placed in the strong box.

Real worries that he'll be eliminated because he broke his alliance with Whiteboy in the last episode. He confides in Megan who reassures him that she is sure it will be her elimination. She feels she is the easiest target and basically has no more room to maneuver. At the power dinner, everyone is quiet and Whiteboy, feeling very powerful, wants to know why they all have such long faces. Whiteboy tries to talk to Real about what he considers Real's betrayal. Seeing her opportunity, Megan tells Whiteboy about Real's earlier conversation. Hoopz jumps in on Real's side and brings up something that Megan allegedly said about Whiteboy several episodes ago. This only makes Whiteboy more upset since he feels that Hoopz should have told him when it happened — not now. Whiteboy now trusts none of the bottom three. At the elimination, Whiteboy calls Real up first leading everyone to think Real will get his check. Whiteboy tells Craig to void Real's check. An angry Real cannot see that his listening to Chance is what got him here. He and Whiteboy argue, but Craig tells Real to take his voided check and sit on the bench. Craig tells Whiteboy to go stand next to Hoopz and Megan. Whiteboy is astonished that he now seems to be in a position to be eliminated by someone he just eliminated. Craig announces that Real is part of the jury. Before anyone can ask about it, 12 Pack, Heather, The Entertainer, Toastee, and Pumkin return and join Real at the bench. Craig says the jury will decide who goes home next. Megan reviews her instigations in each member of the jury's elimination. Not wanting to give them the satisfaction of payback, she quits. The Entertainer is mad because he did not "fly from New York to see Megan quit." Toastee is happy Megan quit and says she's a baby like Brandi C. Megan gets her check voided and leaves. There is nothing for the jury to do now as far as the contest goes. The next day, Hoopz and Whiteboy learn that the final challenge is called "The Dash For the Cash." Hoopz and Whiteboy must run up to people in a Mexican town and collect 100 pesos as quickly as they can. They can sell their clothes, dance or anything to earn a peso. The only thing they cannot do is steal the pesos. Once they get 100 pesos, they must use it to pay a taxi tor take them to their next challenge. Whiteboy, whose bilingual abilities help, works fast, gets his pesos and heads off in his taxi. Hoopz has a lot more trouble getting anyone to understand and help her, but eventually sells her diamond belly button ring. Hoopz runs into more delay when her taxi is stalled in traffic due to an accident. Whiteboy has, in the meantime, arrived at a new set of instructions, directing him to run down a steep trail. He comes out on a beach where there is a giant coin with Craig's picture on it that he must roll through an obstacle course. After that, a boat is waiting for him. An exhausted Hoopz catches up to Whiteboy on the beach and, much to her dismay, sees Whiteboy take off in his boat. She pushes on and finally falls into her boat. When Whiteboy's boat stops, he jumps in the water, swims to the beach and runs up the stairs to the mansion. There he is greeted by Craig who tells him his final challenge is to take pictures of all eliminated contestants and hang them up in order of elimination. Whiteboy frets as he realizes that he has not paid that much attention to the order of elimination throughout the show, further lamenting that his "recreational habits" do not help his memory. Nevertheless, he tries to remember the order of elimination. Whiteboy got all of them right except for the fact that Mr. Boston went home BEFORE Destiney, yet he put Mr. Boston AFTER Destiney. Hoopz makes it to the challenge right about when Whiteboy is realizing that he's not at all sure he has completed the task correctly. Hoopz attacks the challenge as quickly as she can, and begins to put the pictures in the right order. Whiteboy tells Craig he's done but Craig tells Whiteboy he has the order incorrect then he starts switching some of them around but he leaves Mr. Boston and Destiney in the incorrect order. As Whiteboy tries to figure out if he still has any chance, Hoopz tells Craig she's done. She has the order correct. Craig tells Hoopz she won and voids Whiteboy's check. A stunned Hoopz receives her check and exclaims how she cannot wait to provide for her family. Whiteboy takes his elimination in stride and is not a sore loser. He says if he could not be the winner, Hoopz is the only one he would have wanted to see win. Craig, Hoopz, and Whiteboy drink a champagne toast and the competition is over.

- Challenge: The Krazy Toss
- Winner/Pay Master: Whiteboy
- Bottom 3: Hoopz, Megan, Real
- Eliminated: Real
- Jury: Real, Pumkin, Toastee, The Entertainer, Heather, 12 Pack
- Eliminated: Megan (quit)
- Final Challenge: The Dash for The Cash
- Runner-Up: Whiteboy
- Winner: Hoopz

Reason For Elimination

- **Real** - Whiteboy eliminated Real as he was a threat and that he felt betrayed by Real when he told Hoopz that Whiteboy called Hoopz a "bitch".
- **Megan** - Realizing that the jury are the people she sabotaged and got eliminated, Megan decided to quit, knowing she'd get eliminated anyway. The Entertainer was upset by her quitting, saying "I can't believe I flew all the way here to watch this bitch quit"
- **Whiteboy** - Whiteboy lost to Hoopz in the final challenge.

=== Reunion ===
First aired October 12, 2008

The reunion begins with host Craig Jackson coming on and introducing the contestants of I Love Money. He first talks with Mr. Boston and asks him questions. When asked about his elimination, Mr. Boston says he only flipped out because he did not expect Megan and Brandi C. to change sides and regrets it since then. When asked if he feels good about it, Mr. Boston jokes and says he lives in his own house and not in the basement in his mom and dad's house (referring to The Entertainer) and claimed 12 Pack and Megan have been leaving him voice messages of them crying about sending him home and Megan says "Sorry." Mr. Boston says that he wants to have his own reality show where he goes to different countries and tries to sleep with women. He calls Brandi C. a skank when she begins to question whether he really deserves his own show. The Entertainer is then brought is up to discuss why he eliminated Heather and he says everything is cool between them and they show a montage of him still living with his parents. Next, he talks with Megan about how she got many of the contestants eliminated and how she manipulated people. Pumkin yells at Megan and Craig tells Pumkin to come down on the stage and sits in a chair farthest away from Megan. Pumkin and Megan fight about Megan persuading her to eliminate Chance and Megan tells her it was her decision and Pumkin approaches her and Craig tells her to go back with the contestants. Heather comes up on stage to discuss her issues with Megan and once from there, the two of them fight and Heather says Megan had her sloppy seconds (12 Pack), which Megan denies happening. Heather states that 12 Pack is a bigger loser than the Entertainer because he lives with his parents and Entertainer has to drive him around. She also says that she had sex 6 times with 12 Pack and never had an orgasm. Chance and Real come up and talk about being part of the strongest alliance in the house and how the Stallionaires started. Whiteboy joins them on stage and has a peaceful conversation about how their alliance crashed and burned at the end. Hoopz comes out and still cannot believe she won the money. Real comes down to discuss proposing to Hoopz and at one point, he felt like a fool and him and Hoopz are now on good terms about it. Craig jokingly asked if there would be a Real and Hoopz wedding show, Hoopz laughs and says "No." Hoopz has not told her mom about winning the show, since the reunion was taped before the finale aired. Craig invites Hoopz' mom out from backstage and acts like Hoopz did not win. Hoopz then breaks the news to her mom and she is ecstatic. Hoopz plans on using the money to provide for her family and wants to start an accessory line. The show ends with Craig once again congratulating Hoopz for winning the $250,000.

== After the show ==
- Megan Hauserman appeared in her own dating show entitled Megan Wants a Millionaire. Brandi Cunningham appeared on the show in a supporting role. The show was canceled mid-season due to a controversy outside the show which involved one of the contestants.
- Chance and Real appear in two seasons of their own dating game show entitled Real Chance of Love.
- Brandi C., Destiney, Heather, Megan, and Rodeo were contestants on Rock of Love: Charm School, where they placed 7th, 2nd, 4th, 10th, and 11th place respectively.
- 12 Pack was a contestant on Daisy of Love, coming in third place.
- Heat and The Entertainer appeared on the second season of I Love Money, where they placed 13th and 11th place respectively.
- Heather made a guest appearance on Rock of Love Bus with Bret Michaels.
- Mr. Boston (Lee Marks) made a guest appearance on New York Goes to Work.
- Destiney and Pumkin appeared on eleventh episode (entitled Flavor of Love vs. Rock of Love) of Hole in the Wall.
- The Entertainer (Frank Maresca) starred in Frank the Entertainer in a Basement Affair, which premiered Sunday, January 3, 2010 at 8PM on VH1.
- On February 21, 2015, Real (Ahmad Givens) died from his battle with stage 4 colon cancer at the age of 35.
