= Nicole Alexander =

American reality television personality

Nicole Deannae Alexander
- Born: Detroit, Michigan, U.S
- Other names: Hoopz, Nikki
- Occupations: Reality television star, actress
- Years active: 2005-present
- Television: Flavor of Love, I Love Money
- Partner(s): Shaquille O'Neal (2010-2013), Lucky Whitehead (2017-present)
- Children: 2

Nicole Deannae Alexander, better known as Hoopz, is an American reality television star and actress. She is best known for her appearances on the hit VH1 celebreality shows; Flavor of Love and I Love Money. She was also engaged to NBA legend, Shaquille O'Neal.

== Career ==
In 2006, Alexander appeared and was the winner of the first season of the hit VH1 celebreality show, Flavor of Love, where she received the nickname "Hoopz". She revealed during the reunion special that she ended the relationship shortly after the filming of the show was completed, but remained friends with Flavor Flav. She received a large amount of media attention after the show aired including, featuring in many magazines such as; KING and XXL Mag.

In 2008, she competed in the first season of VH1 celebreality spin-off show, I Love Money, which she also won, defeating I Love New York season 1, contestant Joshua "Whiteboy" Gallander in the final challenge. Throughout the series she was aligned with the "Stallionaires" alliance alongside; Ahmad "Real" Givens, Joshua "Whiteboy" Gallander, Kamal "Chance" Givens and Megan Hauserman, and feuded with Frank "The Entertainer" Maresca. In a 2020, interview with Zack Peter, Alexander claimed that the production team at 51 Minds Entertainment, told her they planned for Joshua "Whiteboy" Gallander to win the show. In 2013, she featured in an episode of Celebrity Motor Homes, alongside her then partner Shaquille O'Neal. In 2015, she starred in her own reality television series on the Oxygen network titled. It Takes A Sister, the show followed her life, only airing for one season.

In 2010, Alexander landed the role as Kayla in the film; Ghetto Stories: The Movie. She went on to feature in many independent films.

== Personal life ==
Alexander was previously engaged to retired NBA legend, Shaquille O'Neal, the couple split in 2013. She is currently dating American football player, Lucky Whitehead and has two children.

== Filmography ==
Film and television
Year	Title	Role	Notes
2006	Flavor of Love season 1	Self; contestant	Winner, 11 episodes
2006	Puff, Puff, Pass	Girl outside houseboat	
2008	I Love Money season 1	Self; contestant	Winner, 14 episodes
2009	The Mo'Nique Show	Self; audience member	1 episode
2010	The Gift	Isha Powell	
2010	Ghetto Stories	Kayla	
2010	Convicted	Reporter	Short film
2011	Chronicle	Self; guest	1 episode
2011	Kevin Hart: Laugh at My Pain	Self; audience member	Uncredited
2013	Celebrity Motor Homes	Self; feature	1 episode
2014	Basketball Girlfriend	Collette	
2015	It Takes a Sister	Self; main cast member	7 episodes
2018	First Lady	Maria	
2018	Celebrity Boxing 69	Self; contestant	1 episode
2019	First Lady II: Maria's Revenge	Maria	
2020	Turnt	Donyale Thomas	
2021	First Lady 3	Maria	
2021	Dymez	Kima	
2021	Against the Ropes	Mercedes	TV film
2022	Stay Fly	Leslie	
2022	Circumstances 3	Agent Miraflores	
2022	Chasing the Ghost	Neveah	
2023	Circumstances 4	Agent Miraflores	
2024	P.U.A (Pandemic Unemployment Assistance)	Lexus	
2024	Beach Chain	Amara	
2024	Periodt	Lady Madame	

Music videos
Year	Title	Artist	Role
2005	Party Starter	Will Smith	Dancer
2007	Wouldn't Get Far	The Game featuring Kanye West	Dancer
