= Frank the Entertainer in a Basement Affair =

2010 American reality television show

- Cast
- Created by: Cris Abrego; Mark Cronin
- Starring: Frank Maresca
- Country of origin: United States
- No. of seasons: 1
- No. of episodes: 11

Production
- Executive producers: Cris Abrego; Mark Cronin; Ben Samek
- Running time: 60 minutes (including commercials)
- Production company: 51 Minds Entertainment

Original release
- Network: VH1
- Release: January 3 – March 28, 2010

Related
- I Love New York 2 I Love Money

Frank the Entertainer in a Basement Affair (sometimes stylized Frank the Entertainer... in a Basement Affair) is a VH1 reality television show starring Frank "The Entertainer" Maresca, who previously starred in I Love New York, I Love Money, and I Love Money 2. Unlike other dating shows, the contestants live with Frank and his parents in a house down the street from Frank's real home. The show premiered on January 3, 2010, with the series to run a total of 11 episodes. Fifteen women competed for his love. The winner was Kerry Schwartz.

== Contestants ==
Name	Age	Hometown	Eliminated
Kerry Schwartz	24	Brooklyn, New York	"Winner"
Cathy Nardone	23	Staten Island, New York	Episode 11 (2nd)
Felicia Serano	24	Tampa, Florida	Episode 11 (3rd)
Dana Piza	22	Manhattan, New York	Episode 10
Melody Pinkerton	35	Nashville, Tennessee	Episode 9
Melissa DeBlieck		Bloomington, Minnesota	Episode 8
Annie Hirsch		Syracuse, New York	Episode 7
Renee Taylor	27	Taunton, Massachusetts	Episode 6
Christi Rantis	21	Chicago, Illinois	Episode 5
Jenny Jones		Washington D.C.	Episode 4
Tammy Dinh		Vietnam	Episode 3
Jessica Lopez		Youngstown, Ohio	Episode 2
Mandy	29	Long Island, New York	Episode 2^{[m]}
Stephanie Perry		Miami, Florida	Episode 1
Kari M.	23	Chicago, Illinois	Episode 1

== Call-out order ==
No.	Contestants	Episodes											
No.	Contestants	1	2	3	4	5	6	7	8	9	10	11	
1	Annie	Jenny	Renee	Annie	Annie	Kerry	Felicia	Felicia	Kerry	Felicia	Cathy	Cathy	Kerry
2	Cathy	Tammy	Kerry	Kerry	Felicia	Melody	Kerry	Kerry	Felicia	Cathy	Felicia	Kerry	Cathy
3	Christi	Kerry	Dana	Melody	Dana	Cathy	Cathy	Melissa	Cathy	Kerry	Kerry	Felicia	
4	Dana	Felicia	Melissa	Christi	Christi	Annie	Dana	Cathy	Melody	Dana	Dana		
5	Felicia	Jessica	Tammy	Melissa	Kerry	Dana	Melody	Dana	Dana	Melody			
6	Jenny	Annie	Jenny	Felicia	Melissa	Melissa	Annie	Melody	Melissa				
7	Jessica	Melody	Annie	Dana	Cathy	Renee	Melissa	Annie					
8	Kari	Dana	Melody	Cathy	Melody	Felicia	Renee						
9	Kerry	Christi	Felicia	Renee	Renee	Christi							
10	Mandy	Renee	Christi	Jenny	Jenny								
11	Melissa	Melissa	Cathy	Tammy									
12	Melody	Cathy	Jessica										
13	Renee	Mandy	Mandy										
14	Stephanie	Stephanie											
15	Tammy	Kari											

The contestant won Frank's Love
The contestant won a solo date with Frank
The contestant won a solo date with Frank, and received a key before the elimination ceremony.
The contestant went on a group date with Frank
The contestant was eliminated outside of Elimination Ceremony.
The contestant was eliminated.
The contestant won a date with Frank, but was eliminated.
The contestant decided to leave

- ^{^[m]} In Episode 2, Mandy was eliminated before the ceremony due to Frank's mother's objection to her being in the house.
- ^{^[f]} In Episode 11, Frank tells the ladies that in a unanimous vote they had to decide who of the three will be going home.

== Episodes ==
=== Episode 1: "Meet the Marescas" ===
First aired January 3, 2010

The fifteen female contestants meet Frank Maresca and his parents. A photographer takes a family picture of each contestant with Frank and his parents. Frank consults with his parents when deciding whom to eliminate. In the end, Kari M. and Stephanie are eliminated. Frank's mom had previously expressed that she liked Kari more than Mandy, and was disappointed with Frank's decision.

- Bottom 3: Kari M., Mandy, Stephanie
- Eliminated: Kari M., Stephanie

Reasons for Elimination

- Kari M.: Frank didn't feel a connection with her.
- Stephanie: Frank felt she didn't know anything about him.

=== Episode 2: "A Big Decision" ===
First aired: January 10, 2010

As the episode beings, Frank informs the women that they will each be given an opportunity to showcase one of their talents. Each contestant will be given two minutes in the basement with Frank. The three women whose talents impress Frank the most will be invited on a group date to the Brooklyn bridge. Frank uses his microwave as a timer for each date. During the challenge, Christy decided to teach Frank hula-hooping even though he was better at it than she was. Cathy was late for her timeslot, which upset Frank, and as a result, she was only allowed one minute. Frank's mom interrupts Mandy's time, due to her distrust of Mandy. In the end, Frank is most impressed by Felicia, Kerry, and Renee. After the date, the women have a party outside in the hot tub. Cathy becomes inebriated, which upsets Frank, as he doesn't want her to wake up his parents. Frank's mom discovers vodka in one of the water bottles, and accuses Mandy of placing it there. Later, she further implores Frank to eliminate Mandy. Rather than make Mandy suffer through elimination, Frank privately asks her to leave, as to separate Mandy from his mother. At elimination, Cathy and Jessica are in the bottom two, and it is Jessica who is eliminated.

- Challenge: Two Minutes In Heaven
- Winners: Felicia, Kerry, Renee
- Bottom 2: Cathy, Jessica
- Eliminated: Mandy, Jessica

Reasons for Elimination

- Mandy: Frank felt his mom doesn't like Mandy and feared that both of them will not get along with each other, so he had to separate Mandy from his mother.
- Jessica: Frank felt that she has a lack of focus in her life.

=== Episode 3: "Haggle for My Love" ===
First aired: January 17, 2010

The Marescas are having a garage sale and wants his girls to sell items for money, whichever teams earns the most money wins the date with Frank. With a sluggish start, the yellow team had an idea giving massages for $10, but it irritates Mrs. Maresca. The Blue Team had also had an idea of drawing portraits from Annie. The garage sale ends and the Blue Team won the challenge, earning the most money. Frank took the winning team to a bar. The next day, Frank took Tammy and Christi to a cupcake shop. Frank felt he couldn't understand Tammy sometimes, but Christi gave the scoop about Renee spying on Frank. During elimination, Jenny and Tammy were at the Bottom 2, and ultimately Tammy was sent home.

- Challenge: Maresca's Garage Sale
  - Yellow Team: Christi, Tammy, Felicia
  - Blue Team: Annie, Dana, Jenny
  - Pink Team: Cathy, Renee
  - Green Team: Kerry, Melody, Melissa
- Challenge Winners: Annie, Dana, Jenny
- Bottom 2: Tammy, Jenny
- Eliminated: Tammy

Reasons for Elimination

- Tammy: Frank couldn't connect with her and he couldn't understand want she's saying.

=== Episode 4: "Getting to First Base" ===
First aired: January 24, 2010

- Challenge: 1st Annual Bikini Softball Game
  - Team Spaghetti: Cathy, Melissa, Christi, Melody, Jenny
  - Team Meatballs: Kerry, Felicia, Renee, Dana, Annie
- Challenge Winners: Kerry, Felicia, Renee, Dana, Annie
- MVP: Annie
- Bottom 2: Jenny, Renee
- Eliminated: Jenny

Reasons for Elimination

- Jenny: Frank found a sexy photo of her on the internet despite her "conservative" act and Frank feels that she wasn't into him which upset not only him, but his parents as well.

=== Episode 5: "Nine Franks Are Better Than One" ===
First aired: January 31, 2010

- Challenge: To Take Care Of 9 Little Franks
- Challenge Winners: Melody, Kerry S.
- Bottom 2:: Felicia, Christi
- Eliminated: Christi

Reasons for Elimination

- Christi: Frank felt that he cannot trust Christi after finding out she is still friends with her ex-boyfriend and plus, his parents felt like she was way too young and immature for Frank.

=== Episode 6: "Meet the Rest of the Marescas" ===
First aired: February 14, 2010

- Challenge: To Meet The Entire Maresca Family
- Challenge Winner: Felicia
- Bottom 2:: Melissa, Renee
- Eliminated: Renee

Reasons for Elimination

- Renee: Frank felt that she was too weird.

=== Episode 7: "Sucker Punch My Heart" ===
First aired: February 21, 2010

- Challenge: To Sing For Frank And His Parents
- Team 1 / Working Out: Cathy, Melissa
- Team 2 / Video Games: Felicia, Melody
- Team 3 / Muscle Tees: Kerry S.
- Team 4 / Sleeping In: Annie, Dana
- Challenge Winner/s: Felicia, Melody
- Bottom 2: Annie, Melody
- Eliminated: Annie
- Reason for Elimination:
- Annie: She told Frank to let her go if he didn't have feelings for her. Even though she was a sweet girl, his parents felt like Annie wasn't really his type.

=== Episode 8: "Big Dreams, Little Italy" ===
First aired: February 28, 2010

- Challenge: To Plan A Future With Frank
- Challenge Winner: Kerry S.
- Bottom 2: Dana, Melissa
- Eliminated: Melissa
- Reason for Elimination:
- Melissa: Frank felt that he would get along better with Melissa as a friend.

=== Episode 9: "We Need Therapy!" ===
First aired: March 14, 2010

- Challenge: Therapy With Girls
- Challenge Winner: N/A
- Dates: Melody, Felicia, Dana
- Bottom 2: Dana, Melody
- Eliminated: Melody
- Reason for Elimination:
- Melody: Frank felt that Melody was too good for him.

=== Episode 10: "A Family Affair" ===
First aired: March 21, 2010

- Challenge: Meet Possible Future In-Laws
- Challenge Winner: None
- Bottom 2: Dana, Kerry S.
- Eliminated: Dana
- Reason for Elimination:
- Dana: Frank felt that Dana was too young for him.

=== Episode 11: "Get Me Out of the Basement!" ===
First aired: March 28, 2010

- Final 2: Cathy, Kerry S.
- Eliminated/Quit: Felicia
- Reason for Elimination:
- Felicia: The challenge was choosing between the three last contestants, which girl should go home, and Felicia quit the competition after saying that she felt that Frank had more connection with Kerry and Cathy.
- Winner: Kerry S.
- Runner-up: Cathy

== After the show ==
Frank and Kerry broke up after three days.

Frank's father, Gary Maresca, died on November 16, 2010, after a battle with pancreatic cancer. He was 62 years old.
