= Jamal Trulove =

American actor and wrongful murder convict

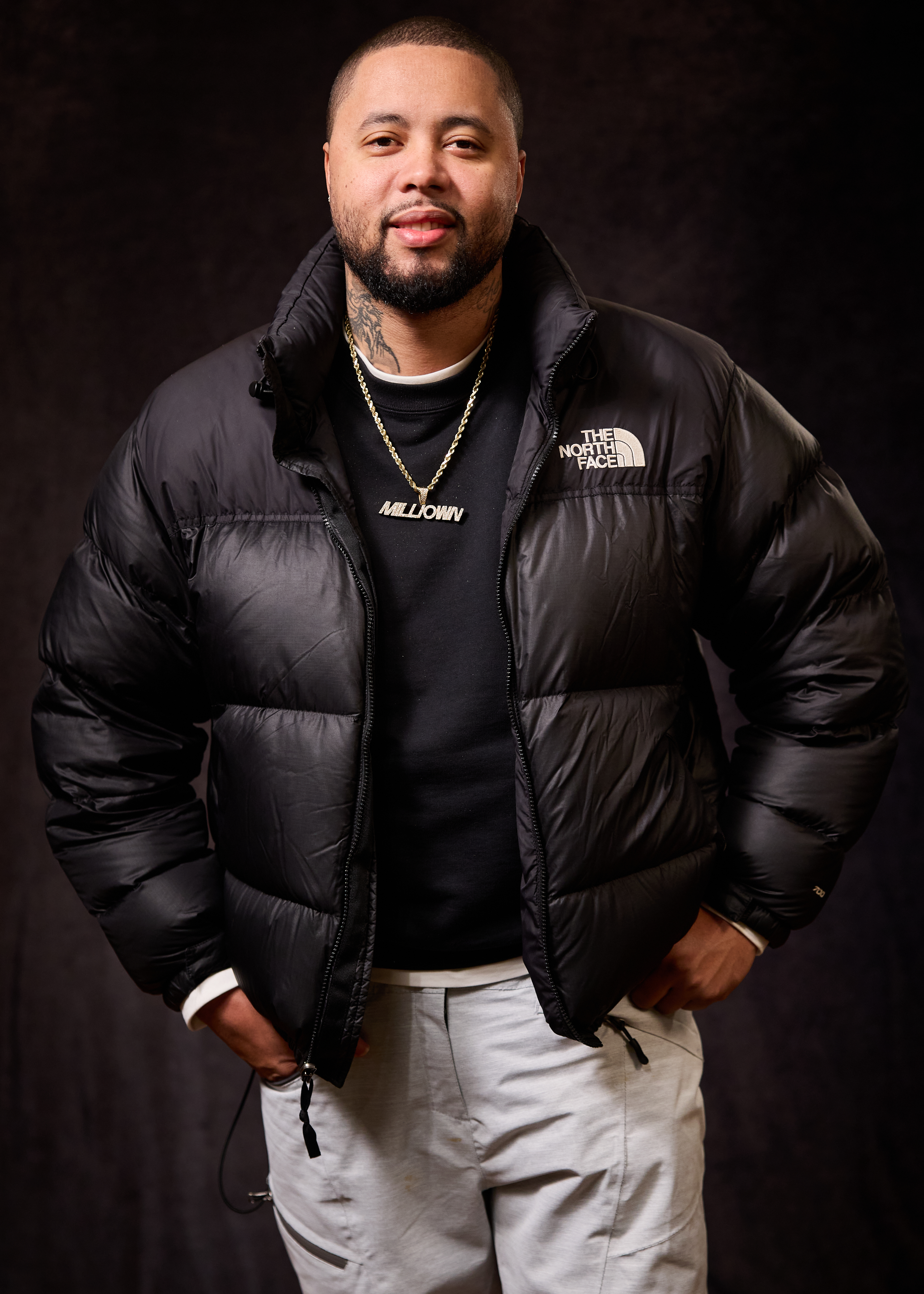
Trulove at the 2024 Sundance Film Festival

Jamal Trulove is an American actor and producer from California. He is a cofounder of Bay Area Film Night, an Oakland based organization creating a film-maker ecosystem. Trulove appeared in the 2019 film The Last Black Man in San Francisco. He was also the victim of a wrongful conviction which was overturned by a California appeals court after 6 years.

== Wrongful conviction ==
After he was framed by police for the 2007 murder of an acquaintance, Trulove was sentenced to 50 years to life and imprisoned for six years. Jamal successfully appealed his conviction and subsequently sued the city of San Francisco.

A California appeals court overturned his conviction in 2014 and he was retried in 2015 and acquitted. In 2016 he sued the city of San Francisco. In April 2018 a jury found the two officers accused of framing him guilty of fabricating evidence and failing to disclose exculpatory evidence. In 2019 the San Francisco Board of Supervisors voted to approve a settlement of $13.1 million.

== Media appearances ==
In 2008, Trulove was selected by a public vote to appear on the VH1 dating show I Love New York 2, where he was nicknamed "Milliown". Tiffany Pollard eliminated him in the first episode.

Trulove appeared in the 2019 film The Last Black Man in San Francisco.
