= Flavor of Love season 1 =

Flavor of Love
- Season 1
- The cast of Flavor of Love
- Starring: Flavor Flav
- No. of episodes: 10

Release
- Original network: VH1
- Original release: January 1 – April 2, 2006

Season chronology
- Next → Season 2

The first season of the VH1 reality television series Flavor of Love brings female contestants into the mansion of Flavor Flav to compete for his love. It aired weekly from January 1, 2006, to April 2, 2006, with a total of ten episodes. This show brought to fame one of the most controversial contestants in reality TV history, Tiffany Pollard, known on the show as "New York".

== Contestants ==
Contestant	Real Name	Hometown	Finish	Place
Bubblez	April Navarro	San Diego, California	Episode 1	20-16
Shellz	Amber Kemp	Las Vegas, Nevada	Episode 1	20-16
Smokey	Johanna Olson	Vancouver, British Columbia	Episode 1	20-16
Picasso	Sarah Louise Wilson	Grand Terrace, California	Episode 1	20-16
Cherry	Mieko Smith	Los Angeles, California	Episode 1	20-16
Georgia	Jefandi Cato †	North DeKalb, Georgia	Episode 2	15-11
Rain	Thela Brown	Seattle, Washington	Episode 2	15-11
Dimplez	Margaret Heinzeroth	Chicago, Illinois	Episode 2	15-11
Apples	Melanie Prudhomme	New York, New York	Episode 2	15-11
Miss Latin	Xotchitl Rodriguez	Pasadena, California	Episode 2	15-11
Peaches	Kim Manning	Ponca City, Oklahoma	Episode 3	10-9
Serious	Cristal Steverson	Detroit, Michigan	Episode 3	10-9
Sweetie	Tika Rainn	Dunwoody, Georgia	Episode 4	8
Red Oyster (Note: Originally given the nickname Oyster by Flav, but changed it to Red Oyster because she disliked it.)	Abigail Kintanar	Los Angeles, California	Episode 5	7 (quit)
Hottie	Schatar Taylor	Boston, Massachusetts	Episode 6	6-5
Smiley	Leilene Ondrade	Toronto, Canada/The Philippines	Episode 6	6-5
Goldie	Courtney Jackson	Raeford, North Carolina	Episode 7	4
Pumkin	Brooke Thompson	Bakersfield, California	Episode 8	3
New York	Tiffany Pollard	Utica, New York	Episode 10	2
Hoopz	Nicole Alexander	Detroit, Michigan	Episode 10	1

== Call-out order ==
Order	Episodes								
Order	1	2	3	4	5	6	7	8	10 (Note: Episode 9 was a recap episode.)
1	Hottie	Sweetie	Red Oyster	Pumkin	Smiley	Goldie	Pumkin	Hoopz	Hoopz
2	Serious	Serious	Sweetie	Red Oyster	Pumkin	New York	Hoopz	New York	New York
3	New York	Smiley	Pumkin	Hoopz	Hoopz	Pumkin	New York	Pumkin	
4	Smiley	Peaches	Smiley	New York	Goldie	Hoopz	Goldie		
5	Peaches	Hoopz	Goldie	Goldie	New York	Smiley; Hottie			
6	Miss Latin	Goldie	New York	Smiley	Hottie	Smiley; Hottie			
7	Hoopz	Hottie	Hottie	Hottie	Red Oyster				
8	Dimplez	New York	Hoopz	Sweetie					
9	Apples	Pumpkin	Peaches; Serious						
10	Red Oyster	Red Oyster	Peaches; Serious						
11	Georgia	Georgia; Rain; Dimplez; Apples; Miss Latin							
12	Sweetie	Georgia; Rain; Dimplez; Apples; Miss Latin							
13	Pumkin	Georgia; Rain; Dimplez; Apples; Miss Latin							
14	Rain	Georgia; Rain; Dimplez; Apples; Miss Latin							
15	Goldie	Georgia; Rain; Dimplez; Apples; Miss Latin							
16	Bubblez; Shellz; Smokey; Picasso; Cherry								
17	Bubblez; Shellz; Smokey; Picasso; Cherry								
18	Bubblez; Shellz; Smokey; Picasso; Cherry								
19	Bubblez; Shellz; Smokey; Picasso; Cherry								
20	Bubblez; Shellz; Smokey; Picasso; Cherry								

The contestant quit the competition
The contestant was eliminated.

== Episodes ==
=== "Fifteen Beds and a Bucket of Puke" ===
First aired January 1, 2006

The twenty contestants arrive at the mansion to discover that there are only fifteen beds. When naming the girls, the first person to receive her name is "Oyster," a name she dislikes. Flav gives all of the girls nicknames, but cannot think of one for a particular girl, who tells him she likes scuba diving, so he names her 'Shellz.' Oyster then reveals that she has worn red clothing every day for six years straight, and decides to name herself "Red Oyster", which Flav accepts. Hottie is very aggressive with Flav, which he likes. New York comments about all of the girls being "a loud pack of idiot bitches," sparking her reputation for being the villainess. Goldie drinks too much champagne, vomits, and passes out. Hottie is the first to receive a clock, and Rain manages to get Goldie standing in time for the elimination ceremony, and she is the last person to receive her clock. On her way out Cherry cries and wonders how "Goldie, who puked in a bucket, a gallon of puke" stays. Smokey, Shellz, Picasso, and Bubblez are also eliminated.

- Eliminated: Bubblez, Shellz, Smokey, Picasso, Cherry

Reasons for elimination

- Flav felt he had not gotten to know any of the five girls, and they didn't stand out.

=== "Rub a Dub Flav" ===
First aired January 7, 2006

The fifteen remaining contestants engage in a competition where Flav has 10 minutes to spend with each woman in a private hot tub. In the van on the way to the resort, Rain and New York get into a heated argument over New York's unfriendliness towards her, Goldie, Georgia, and Pumkin, when they tried to befriend New York, in which Peaches and Hoopz try to comfort both New York and Rain. At the resort, contestants prepare themselves and their hot tub with candles and drinks to keep Flav entertained. Some of the hot tub settings are nice, but some are strange, such as Hottie's. Flav states "Hottie is very 'dramatical.' She tried to 'hypnotize' me!" In the end, Flav picks Smiley, New York, and Miss Latin for a private roller skating date, where Smiley reveals she was previously married. (It was revealed in the reunion show that she was only divorced one week before the taping of the show.) Later at the house, Pumkin confronts New York about her hostility towards the other contestants in the house, resulting in the two of them fighting and exchanging insults, but Red Oyster, Hottie, Smiley, and Rain try to break up the ruckus, with Red Oyster, Smiley, and Hottie shielding New York and Rain protecting Pumkin, who screams profanity at New York. Pumkin goes to Flav for advice on how to handle the situation with New York, while New York, still attempting to go after Pumkin. Red Oyster, Hottie, and Smiley tell New York that Pumkin is not worth going after. Red Oyster and Hottie get Miss Latin out, by informing Flav that Miss Latin has been calling her ex-boyfriend, Kash, from the house, saying not to hang up. He hangs up on her. Miss Latin, Rain, Georgia, Apples, and Dimplez are eliminated. Apples' and Dimplez's names are never revealed on-screen.

- Challenge: to keep Flav entertained in a hot tub
- Winners: Smiley, New York, Miss Latin
- Eliminated: Georgia, Rain, Dimplez, Miss Latin, Apples

Reasons for elimination

- Georgia: Flav still had not gotten to know her, and she didn't stand out.
- Rain: Red Oyster and Hottie told Flav that Rain had a bit of a temper.
- Dimplez: She did not stand out
- Apples: She did not stand out
- Miss Latin: Red Oyster and Hottie told Flav that Miss Latin was calling her ex from his house.

=== "A Friend of Flav's is a Friend of Mine" ===
First aired January 15, 2006

Flav takes the women to visit some of his "old friends" as well as some "new friends." The five contestants who are taken to meet Flav's "old friends" suspect that they will be meeting his celebrity friends (most notably the other members of Public Enemy) but are surprised when they arrive at a senior center where their challenge is to care for and socialize with the elderly. Some girls have fun with the challenge, while some, such as New York, are uncomfortable. Sweetie wins and surprisingly declines to kiss Flav, saying it would take about three more weeks until she was ready.

The five contestants that go to meet Flav's "new friends" are taken to a park where they are challenged to organize and execute a birthday party for young children. Though Pumkin thought she would win, everyone was surprised when Serious did. New York walks out of the senior citizen center when a woman asks her for help with her false teeth, and Pumkin, a substitute teacher, cries after Flav says she was the most distant when playing with the children.

New York accuses Hottie of stealing her jacket because she had stated that she was so competitive that she might cut up someone's clothes, steal, and hide things to win. Hottie rebuffs New York, saying New York is just jealous, because Hottie believes she looks like Beyoncé. New York mockingly tells her she looks more like Luther Vandross. New York's exact words from the unrated DVD to Beyoncé was " Beyonce, sweetie, I'm so sorry that an ugly ass bitch like this would even say that, oh my god." Serious showed her breasts to Hottie and says that if Hottie's "double D's" do not look like hers, then it don't matter. All the girls (mainly New York and Pumkin) then begin confronting Hottie, about past comments she made about being so competitive, that she would quote, "hide things", "cut clothes", "steal", etc, and that if something is missing in the house, they will always come to Hottie. Hottie tells Pumkin, "You need to learn how to read." Pumkin comes back at Hottie with, "I can read you, fat fucking bitch that's all I need to read." New York keeps advising Hottie to quote, "pack all your shit up", because Hottie will be eliminated.

Neither New York nor Hottie is happy when Flav gives them both clocks. Serious does not receive a clock because Red Oyster and Hottie got her out by informing Flav that they believe that she is only here to further her modeling career. Peaches is also eliminated as well.

- Challenge: to meet some "old" and "new" friends
- Winners: Sweetie (old), Serious (new)
- Eliminated: Serious, Peaches

Reasons for elimination

- Serious: Red Oyster and Hottie told Flav that Serious was only there to further her career in modeling.
- Peaches: Flav said he was not feeling her.

=== "The Flavor of Chicken" ===
First aired January 22, 2006

The contestants try to impress Flav's mother (Anna Drayton) by accompanying her to church, introducing themselves over tea and pastries at a tea room and by attempting to cook fried chicken. Hottie attempts to cook her chicken in the microwave, stuffed with raw vegetables, as she believed (according to Red Oyster) that the button that said 'chicken' meant that the microwave would cook an entire chicken; it is ultimately presented as raw to Flav and his mother. Goldie says, "Bitch is crazy!" Hoopz wins the cooking competition. Sweetie is disappointed because she hates chicken after an incident when she was five, and is angry that she cooked a chicken for nothing. Hoopz then has dinner with Flav and his mother, who warms up to Hoopz after initially being indifferent to her. Sweetie is eliminated, as Flav doubts whether she really likes him, and argues that she feels that she has shown him several times that she likes him (cooking a chicken, staying up late for a date, etc.) She tells Flav off as she exits the house and calls Flav "retarded" in a New Jersey accent, shocking the other girls. Outside the mansion, she complains that he left a lot of "jokes" in the competition, referring to New York, Red Oyster and Hottie.

- Challenge: to make fried chicken
- Winner: Hoopz
- Eliminated: Sweetie

Reason for elimination

- Sweetie: Flav doubted that she had love for him

=== "What Happens in Flavor Stays in Flavor" ===
First aired January 29, 2006

Flav takes the seven remaining girls to Las Vegas to test their luck, literally, at a roulette table. Each girl is given $100 in chips and 10 minutes at the wheel. Several of the girls blow their entire stake in one roll. New York wins the most money for Flav by winning $465, earning herself a one-on-one date with him that night. New York confesses her love for Flav, and Flav is troubled when New York admits that she would be upset if he were to kiss other women.

During New York's date with Flav, Hoopz, Goldie, Hottie, Red Oyster, Pumkin, and Smiley go to a strip club. Hoopz is convinced Red Oyster and Hottie are going to tattle on them for going there. When they return from Vegas, Flav organizes a "Five Senses" challenge. Throughout the entire competition, Smiley and New York were the runaway leaders in terms of points accumulated. For the final part of the challenge, Smiley does a very erotic dance (which is uncensored on the DVD). New York attempts an erotic dance and nearly falls through the privacy screen (so Flav could not tell who was who). Due to New York's gaffe, Smiley wins, and she spends time with Flav in his hot tub.

During the elimination ceremony at the end of the episode, Red Oyster announces that she is eliminating herself from the competition to be with her father, who she has just found out was in a serious car accident. Flav tells Red Oyster he is sorry to see her go because he would have saved her from elimination. New York and Hottie had not received clocks at that time, and were saved from elimination, even though one of them was scheduled to leave that night. New York was troubled because she desperately wanted to know if she would have received a clock or not. Red Oyster hugs her ally New York on her way out, New York tells Red Oyster, "youre the only bitch i ever respected in the house". Hottie tells Red Oyster that the same thing happened to her, but Red Oyster insults her, also revealing to Hottie that it was Red Oyster herself that ripped the pages out of Hottie's diary, because she did not like Hottie trying to start something between Red Oyster and New York.

- Challenge: Roulette
- Winner: New York
- Challenge: Five Senses
- Winner: Smiley
- Quit: Red Oyster

Reason for withdrawal

- Red Oyster: Red Oyster had found out her father was in a very serious car crash, and wanted to be home to be there with him.

=== "InterroGitted" ===
First aired February 12, 2006

Flav's old flame, Brigitte Nielsen, visits the house to administer lie detector tests to the six remaining contestants. While having his hair braided, Flav sees Hottie on an episode of Blind Date, where she states that she is looking to date a man who will spend money on her. He calls Hoopz, Smiley, Pumkin and Goldie, who happened to be nearby, into his bedroom, and what they see shocks them. Later, Pumkin reveals to the girls, but not to Flav, that she has also been on Blind Date. The lie detector test shows that Hottie lied about her age and her body measurements. Goldie was the only one who was completely truthful on her test, though Smiley was honest in admitting she still loved her ex-husband and was previously a stripper. Hoopz spends the majority of the night arguing with Brigitte Nielsen, and abruptly leaves a dinner Brigitte threw in their honor, but Hoopz manages to escape elimination. Smiley reveals her past as an exotic dancer, then argues with New York and the other contestants after admitting that she still has feelings for her ex-husband. New York informs Flav about it, but refuses to mention Smiley directly. Pumkin readily volunteers Smiley's name. When Flav meets with Brigitte, she tells Flav that none of the girls are right for him. Flav eliminates Hottie for not being truthful and for coming across as a 'gold-digger' on "Blind Date". Flav had a clock for Smiley but chose not to give it to her for having issues with her ex-husband.

- Challenge: Lie detector test
- Winner: Goldie
- Eliminated: Hottie, Smiley

Reasons for elimination

- Hottie: Flav found footage of her on Blind Date, in which she acted like a gold-digger, making Flav believe she was only after his money.
- Smiley: Flav originally had a clock for her, but eliminated her so she could go home and work on her issues with her ex-husband.

=== "Flav's Trippin'" ===
First aired February 19, 2006

The four remaining ladies go on an overnight trip with Flav. New York expresses disgust with both Hoopz and Pumkin being amongst the four remaining contestants, and criticizes Goldies weight, but admits that Goldie is okay, and that she does not dislike Goldie. First, Pumkin and Hoopz go with Flav to a spa in Palm Springs, California where they do yoga, mud body painting, and then all enjoy a clean-up shower together. During dinner, Pumkin uses Hoopz's restroom break as her opportunity to give Flav a personal letter, which indicated that she wanted to be intimate with him that night. After reading it, he later informs Hoopz that he and Pumkin are heading back to his room to spend the night together. New York is not at all happy that Flav chose Hoopz and Pumkin for the first date instead of her. For the second trip, Flav takes Goldie and New York to San Diego, where they visit the World Famous San Diego Zoo and Flav chooses to spend the night with Goldie, though she just wants to be his friend. At the end of the episode Goldie is eliminated, claiming that he saw her only as a friend. Flav and Goldie leave on very good terms, and Goldie gives heartfelt goodbye hugs to Pumkin and Hoopz. Also she says that she feels sorry for New York because now that she is gone "no one will talk to her."

- Challenge: spa, zoo
- Eliminated: Goldie

Reasons for elimination

- Goldie: Flav felt more of a friendship connection with Goldie

=== "Family Flavors" ===
First aired February 26, 2006

Flav goes on outings with the three remaining girls' parents. He takes Pumkin and her mother Teri to get a manicure and a pedicure, takes Hoopz and her mother Donna to Medieval Times, and takes New York and her parents Alex and Michelle (Sister Patterson) to the Santa Malibu Tennis Resort. During Pumkin's outing, her mother reveals to Flav that Pumkin had also appeared on Blind Date, which the other girls (but not Flav) knew, and that she had been on numerous other game shows, such as Family Feud. Hoopz expresses her feeling that if she does not hook up with Flav at the end of the day, her mother might, since they took to themselves quite a bit. En route to the tennis resort, New York's mother proclaims that her daughter has gotten fat, which embarrasses New York. Flav does not get along well with New York's mother, who loudly objects to any possibility of her daughter marrying Flav.

Pumkin's failure to tell Flav about her past appearance on Blind Date leads to her elimination at the end of the episode. During the elimination ceremony, in an attempt to ruin New York's image in front of Flav, Pumkin claims that New York is an aspiring actress, which ignites a heated exchange between the two women. While Pumkin is saying goodbye to Hoopz, New York urges her to hurry up and exit the set, to which Pumkin replies, 'Actually I can slap the shit out of you, 'cuz you need to shut the fuck up!!' New York responds, 'Do it, slap me bitch!', Pumkin responds by spitting in New York's face, causing New York to push Pumkin into the cameras, while yelling, 'You motherfucking whore!' at Pumkin. New York further attempts to attack Pumkin, who hides behind the crew on set and eventually storms out of the mansion, with Flav telling Pumkin to leave the mansion immediately, and that he wasn't gonna pour out any champaign for Pumkin, due to her spitting on somebody and being a sore loser.

Outside the mansion, Pumkin states that she no longer cares for Flav, and if he should pick New York in the end, he would get what he deserves. She also threatens to come back to the show with a gun to shoot New York. She later denied saying this on her Myspace page, stating that her VH1 contract entitled them to cut off the rest of her words when they like. In an interview, Pumkin denied spitting in New York's face. She claims to have been told by producers that she would be leaving before this was filmed and to give them a "big ending." She asked what kind of an ending they wanted and they suggested spitting. She also claims that the spit was digitally enhanced. Regardless, the incident is considered the most shocking and popular moment of the entire series.

Back in the mansion, Flav gives New York her clock, but before doing so, he asks her if she really wants it. She says yes, but she wants to "beat Pumkin's ass" for spitting on her. When the clock ceremony is over, Flav directs the two finalists to pack their bags because they're going to Mexico, which excites them, especially New York. She says that she will forget about the situation between her and Pumkin for now, but vows to settle it at a later point. While New York and Hoopz are preparing for their flight to Mexico, New York runs back downstairs to fight Pumkin. The producers warn her that if she does, she will not go to Mexico (this scene was revealed at the recap episode).

This episode is also notable for the fact that the mothers of Hoopz and New York reveal their daughters' real names ("Nikki" and "Tiffany", respectively) on air.

- Challenge: Meet the parents
- Eliminated: Pumkin

Reasons for elimination

- Pumkin: For her failure to tell Flav she had been on many other TV shows, and he felt Pumkin was more on his show for fame.

=== "For Flav's Consideration" ===
First aired March 5, 2006

This episode was made to take a look back on this season of "dating, mating, and eliminating." Also, it showed never-before-seen footage. They included:
- New York and Hoopz's casting tapes
- The extended van fight between Rain and New York
- A fight between Pumkin and New York that was not shown
- An argument between Brigitte Nielsen and Flavor Flav
- Hoopz and New York getting fitted for gold teeth
- The extended version of the Pumkin and New York "spit incident"

=== "Flavor of Decision" aka "Viva La Flav" ===
First aired March 12, 2006

The episode begins with Flav, Hoopz, and New York still shocked about Pumkin spitting on New York. New York still threatening to "beat Pumkins ass" next time she sees Pumkin. Flav asks Hoopz what would she do if somebody spat on her. Hoopz also states that she would beat their ass, too. The final two contestants, Hoopz and New York, take a trip to Mexico with Flav. They each get a 24-hour period to spend alone with Flav, and the first to go is New York. Flav decides to test her (because of her dislike for the outdoors) by taking her to a secluded beach for some kayaking. Later, during dinner, Flav gives New York a necklace with her show name on it. They then head back to the hotel, where the determined New York decides to share his bed that night. She later tells Hoopz that they did not have sex but were "making music" and "making love" all night, which repulses Hoopz. Hoopz has her date with Flav the next day, and they ride zip lines through the jungle. During their dinner, Hoopz also receives a necklace and they proceed to spend the evening cuddling.

After returning from Mexico, the women are treated (separately) to a day of dress shopping and getting their hair done for the impending final elimination ceremony. New York loves her dress and her hairdo, while Hoopz feels her hairstyle and choice of dress makes her look ugly. At the elimination, both women arrive wearing the same dress, and make comments about how bad it looks on the other. After being certain that neither woman will be angry with him for choosing the other, Flav apologizes to New York and reveals his choice is Hoopz. New York spends the limo ride questioning if it really just happened that way, and questioning why Flav would do that to her. Back in the house, Flav presents Hoopz with a set of gold teeth matching his own.

- Winner: Hoopz
- Runner up: New York

=== "After the Lovin' (Finale)" ===
First aired April 2, 2006

All of the contestants are invited back to talk and take a look at highlights of the season, including the vomiting, the infamous spitting, and general cat-fighting. Many of the early cuts on the show such as Apples, Dimplez and Picasso look out of place at the reunion. Flav gives a hug to Smokey. The host, La La, believing that Red Oyster (who is now known to be Flav's lookout) has her own secrets that need to be revealed. She then announced to everyone that Red Oyster was married while on the show. Oyster claims to be divorced, both now and then. Flav believes her, but the other former contestants do not. Rain and Georgia then confront Red Oyster, and call Red Oyster a "snitch". Flav tries to explain to Rain and Georgia that when Red Oyster was informing him of what was going on in the house, that she was just being his lookout. Rain and Georgia then point out that Red Oyster is not doing it for him, that Red Oyster's doing it for herself, just so she can win the competition. Rain and Red Oyster then begin a vulgarity-laced exchange. Red Oyster confronts Miss Latin about her calling her ex-boyfriend from Flav's mansion. Serious, a model before the show, maintains that she was genuinely interested in Flav and was not on the show to boost her career. Next, the most anticipated part of the show, Pumkin and New York's first reunion since Pumkin's elimination. New York is brought out first and begins to argue with Cherry. This argument started when Cherry questioned Flav about why he kept New York if he wanted harmony in his house. New York asks her why she should even matter because she was one of the first to be eliminated. They yell at each other, which leads to Cherry getting escorted out, per the audiences request. Pumkin then comes out and New York attempts to "bitch slap" her. La La and Big Rick attempt to get them to solve their problems with words. Flav tells Pumkin and New York he loves them both, before he and La La both get back, worried its gonna get physical again. Pumkin tells her what's on her mind with the time she received. New York spends her time by knocking over one of the boards that separated the two and attempting to attack Pumkin once again. When Big Rick caught her, her breasts were exposed. Pumkin runs from New York into the audience to Rain and Georgia and says, "I didn't come on no Jerry fucking Springer, get the fucking psycho bitch outta here! I woulda bought my pepper spray, but i was searched on the way in". Rain and Georgia laugh at Pumkin. Nothing worked out, so Big Rick escorts Pumkin and New York back to their seats. Later, Hoopz is brought out to discuss her relationship with Flav. He says he needs her to explain because he does not understand what happened. Hoopz reveals that her connection with Flav was not "like that" sort of connection. New York then calls out that she knew it the whole time, with Big Rick making sure New York doesn't go after Pumkin again. Flav announces that there will be a second season of the series, to once again attempt to find "the next great love of his life."

== DVD release ==
The complete first season came out on DVD on August 29, 2006. It is a 3-Disc Unrated edition with extra features including the reunion and the Vh1.com V-Spot extras.

== After the show ==
- Serious (Cristal Steverson) was employed for a short time as a radio personality for Hot 107.9, where she interviewed Crunk&B trio, Taurus.
- Sweetie (Tika Rainn) rapped on the 2007 L.A. auditions of America's Got Talent.
- Pumkin (Brooke Thompson), Smiley (Leilene Ondrade), Serious (Cristal Steverson), Goldie (Courtney Jackson), Rain (Thela Brown), and Hottie (Schatar Taylor) appeared on Flavor of Love Girls: Charm School.
- Hoopz (Nicole Alexander) and Pumkin appeared on the first season of I Love Money.
- Smiley appeared on the second season of I Love Money. The year before that she appeared on WWE Diva Search.
- New York appeared on the second season of Flavor of Love. VH1 offered her other production shows like her own dating game show I Love New York, and spin-offs including New York Goes to Hollywood and New York Goes to Work.
- Georgia (Jefandi Cato) died on May 25, 2021.
- Picasso (Sarah Wilson) is now a full time artist, and has also helped produced and direct various shorts and films.
- Smokey (Johanna Olson) had minor and recurring roles in movies and TV shows. And also pursued a singing career under the name "Portia Dee".
- Dimplez (Margaret Heinzeroth) became a production designer for a few TV shows and shorts.
- Peaches (Kim Manning) continued her singing career.

== See also ==
- List of Flavor of Love contestants
