= Craig Jackson (journalist) =

American journalist

Craig Jabbar Jackson
- Other names: Craig J. Jackson, CJ
- Occupations: Journalist, news anchor, television host, stand-up comedian
- Years active: 1980-2017
- Television: I Love Money, The X Show, 30 Seconds to Fame

Craig "CJ" Jackson, also known as Craig J. Jackson, is an American journalist, news anchor, television host, actor and stand-up comedian. He is best known for hosting the hit VH1 celebreality spin-off show I Love Money.

== Hosting career ==
Jackson began his career as a news anchor and correspondent for Channel One News for five years. In 1999 Jackson hosted FX's The X Show. In 2002 Jackson began hosting Fox's short lived reality competition series 30 Seconds to Fame.

Jackson hosted multiple pilot episodes for the Game Show Network, including one for a show titled, Two Minute Mysteries.

In 2008 Jackson began hosting VH1's hit celebreality spin-off I Love Money. Jackson was the only host for the four seasons of the show. Despite its huge success and popularity, the show was ultimately cancelled after the fourth season. This was due to I Love Money season 3 and Megan Wants A Millionaire cast member Ryan Jenkins murdering his wife Jasmine Fiore. The third season of I Love Money has never been aired as of 2025, and Megan Wants A Millionaire was cancelled after 3 episodes. Jackson also hosted the clip show and reunion specials.

In 2009 Jackson hosted Discovery Channel's National Body Challenge, he also co-hosted Midnight Money Madness on the TBS channel. Jackson would maintain a career in the stand-up comedy circuit.

== Acting career ==
Jackson had a small splash in acting, in 1980 he had a cameo appearance in How to Beat the High Cost of Living. He also made appearances in 1999's Providence and Reaching the Finish Line, as well as small roles throughout the early 2000s in shows; Crossing Jordan, ER and John From Cincinnati.

In 2012 he had a small role in the TV film Strawberry Summer.

In 2017 Jackson was the writer and director for TV series Crime Pays.

== Filmography ==
Year	Title	Role	Notes
1980	How to Beat the High Cost of Living	Man on stage	
1996	Dangerous Minds	Self, host	1 episode
1999	Providence	Orderly	1 episode
1999	The X Show	Self, host	17 episodes
1999	Reaching the Finish Line	Host	TV Film
2002-2003	30 Seconds to Fame	Self, host	11 episodes
2003	Crossing Jordan	Technician	1 episode
2004	ER	Officer Ogilvie	1 episode
2006	Midnight Money Madness	Self, co-host	
2007	John From Cincinnati	Reporter	3 episodes
2008-2009	I Love Money	Host	All episodes
2009	Up All Nite	Host / producer	6 episodes
2009	National Body Challenge	Host	5 episodes
2012	Strawberry Summer	TV Reporter	TV Film
