= Real Chance of Love =

- Created by: Cris Abrego; Mark Cronin
- Starring: Kamal Givens; Ahmad Givens
- Opening theme: "Does She Love Me?"
- Composer: The Stallionaires
- Country of origin: United States
- No. of seasons: 2
- No. of episodes: 26

Production
- Executive producers: Cris Abrego; Mark Cronin; Ben Samek
- Running time: 45–48 minutes
- Production company: 51 Minds Entertainment

Original release
- Network: VH1
- Release: October 20, 2008 – October 26, 2009

Real Chance of Love is an American reality television dating game show featuring two brothers, Ahmad "Real" Givens and Kamal "Chance" Givens, of the rap group The Stallionares, former contestants on I Love New York, who are looking for love. The show was first brought up in August 2007 when Mr. Boston of the first season of I Love New York was offered his own reality show. Boston declined and the plans eventually fell through, leaving the show to be picked up by Real and Chance.

== Season one ==
The first season premiered October 20, 2008, and featured seventeen female contestants taking part in various challenges in a format similar to other VH1 and MTV dating contest programs. Each week, women were eliminated until the final episode where the brothers had to make their final selections. Ultimately, Ahmad (Real) selected Corn Fed, while Kamal (Chance) selected nobody. The series consisted of 14 episodes. A few days after the reunion show was taped, Corn Fed and Real ended their relationship.

== Season two ==
It was reported on the VH1 blog that there will be a "second season" of Real Chance of Love, with the working title Real Chance of Love 2. Twenty women will move into the Stallionaire Ranch and compete for the brother of their choice. In March 2009, Real Chance of Love 2 auditions were held in selected cities. Real and Chance appeared on Chelsea Lately on May 25, 2009, to talk about the second season of Real Chance of Love. The show premiered on August 3, 2009. Ultimately, Ahmad (Real) selected Doll, while Kamal (Chance) selected Hot Wings.

== Airing of the show ==
Season	Premiere	Finale	Reunion	Winners	Runners-up	Contestants	Episodes
Season One	October 20, 2008 (2.2M viewers)	January 12, 2009 (4.19M viewers)	January 26, 2009 (3.041M viewers)	Real: Abbi La Nay Noah "Corn Fed"	Real: Konanga Tyson "Bay Bay Bay"	17	14
Season One	October 20, 2008 (2.2M viewers)	January 12, 2009 (4.19M viewers)	January 26, 2009 (3.041M viewers)	Chance: No One	Chance: Ebony Jones "Risky" & Christine Ly "Cali"	17	14
Season Two	August 3, 2009 (2.518M viewers)	October 26, 2009 (2.5M viewers)	None	Real: Jackie DaFonseca "Doll"	Real: Gabrielle "Sassy"	20	12
Season Two	August 3, 2009 (2.518M viewers)	October 26, 2009 (2.5M viewers)	None	Chance: Kamille Leai "Hot Wings"	Chance: Michelle "Mamacita"	20	12

== Spin-offs ==
- I Love Money features contestants from Real Chance of Love, Rock of Love with Bret Michaels, I Love New York, and Flavor of Love competing in different challenges for the ultimate prize of $250,000.
- Charm School with Ricki Lake features contestants from Real Chance of Love and Rock of Love Bus.
- One Mo' Chance
