= I Love Money =

American reality television series

- Genre: Reality competition
- Presented by: Craig Jackson
- Country of origin: United States
- Original language: English
- No. of seasons: 4 (1 unaired)
- No. of episodes: 41

Production
- Executive producers: Mark Cronin; Cris Abrego
- Production locations: Huatulco, Mexico (seasons 1–2); Manzanillo, Mexico (seasons 3-4)
- Running time: 43–44 minutes
- Production company: 51 Minds Entertainment

Original release
- Network: VH1
- Release: July 6, 2008 – December 1, 2010

I Love Money is an American reality television series broadcast by VH1.

The series was produced by 51 Minds Entertainment, a subsidiary of Endemol, and was a spin-off of Flavor of Love, Charm School, I Love New York, Rock of Love with Bret Michaels, Real Chance of Love, For the Love of Ray J, Daisy of Love and Megan Wants a Millionaire. Contestants on these shows competed in physical and mental challenges, aiming for a $250,000 grand prize. Created by executive producers Cris Abrego and Mark Cronin. The contestants of the first two seasons were located in Huatulco, Mexico for the duration of their time on the show, while the third and fourth season contestants were located in Manzanillo, Mexico.

== Airing of the show ==
Season	Premiere	Finale	Reunion show	Winner	Runner-up	Number of contestants	Number of episodes
Season 1	July 6, 2008 (2.2M viewers)	October 5, 2008 (2.93M viewers)	October 12, 2008	Nicole Alexander "Hoopz"	Joshua Gallander "Whiteboy"	17	14
Season 2	February 2, 2009 (2.3M viewers)	May 4, 2009 (2.591M viewers)	May 10, 2009	Angela Pitts "Myammee"	George Weisgerber "Tailor Made"	19	15
Season 3	Cancelled						
Season 4	September 16, 2010 (731k viewers)	December 1, 2010 (541k viewers)	None	Mindy Hall	Chris Cas "Brooklyn"	18	12

== Season 1 ==
In the first season, the contestants were selected from the first two seasons of Flavor of Love, Rock of Love and I Love New York and competed in physical and mental challenges in an attempt to win $250,000. Production started in early February 2008, and concluded in March 2008. The show premiered on July 6, 2008 and the casting special aired on July 1. The show is hosted by Craig J. Jackson. The winner was Nicole Alexander better known as "Hoopz".

== Season 2 ==
In the second season, the contestants were selected from the shows Flavor of Love, Rock of Love, I Love New York, and Real Chance of Love and are competing in physical and mental challenges in an attempt to win $250,000. Production started in late October 2008, and concluded in November 2008. The show premiered on February 2, 2009, with Craig J. Jackson returning as host. The winner was Angela "Myammee" Pitts.

== Season 3 (Unaired) ==
I Love Money 3 would have been a follow-up to the previous seasons of the show. The contestants were to be selected from other VH1 reality shows such as Flavor of Love, Rock of Love with Bret Michaels, I Love New York, Real Chance of Love, For the Love of Ray J, Daisy of Love, and Megan Wants a Millionaire. Production began in late June 2009 and wrapped early August 2009, with Craig J. Jackson returning to host. Ryan Alexander Jenkins was the winner.

Reportedly, I Love Money 3 was set to air in January 2010. In August 2009, VH1 canceled any showings of season three due to castmember Ryan Jenkins's suspected involvement in the murder of Jasmine Fiore, as well as Jenkins's suicide. It had been revealed that Jenkins had been convicted for assault in 2007. However, due to a lapse by the firm subcontracted to vet Jenkins, this was never disclosed to VH1 or 51 Minds. According to 51 Minds officials, had Jenkins' record been known, he would have barred from any 51 Minds show.

The girls who competed were Deelishis and Buckeey from Flavor of Love, Lacey Conner and Marcia "Brazil' Alves from Rock of Love, Bubbles from Real Chance of Love and Lil Hood, Cashmere, and Cocktail from For the Love of Ray J. The boys who competed were Wolf and Pretty from I Love New York, Fox, Sinister, Weasel, Big Rig, and Professor from Daisy of Love, and Joe Pascolla and Ryan Jenkins from Megan Wants a Millionaire. As of 2026, the third season remains unreleased. In 2025, producer Mark Cronin stated that the footage from the unaired third season has never been edited into episodes.

On May 9, 2020, Lil Hood, Weasel, Big Rig, and Joe participated in a one-time tell-all on YouTube; Lil Hood stated in the intro that the cast would not mention Jenkins or Jasmine Fiore; rather, they would just focus on what happened in the show. On November 23, 2020, Cocktail made a guest appearance on Lacey's Talk of Love Podcast to talk about everything she remembered from her time on the show, she was the runner up in the finale and confirmed Ryan Jenkins was the winner. In April 2024, Buckeey, also known as Shay Johnson, briefly talked about her experience on the show in an interview with Carlos King, in which she confirms Jenkins was the winner of the show.

== Season 4 ==
I Love Money 4 was produced as a follow-up to I Love Money 3. Production began in August 2009, immediately after the finish of filming for season three. In April 2010, it was confirmed by VH1 executive vice president Jeff Olde that neither season would air. Despite earlier indicating that the season would not air, it was later reported that the season had been placed into a late night time slot in September 2010, though viewer demand encouraged VH1 to later move the episode premiere to a prime time Wednesday time slot. Cast members indicated that the Jasmine Fiore murder scandal affected the filming and editing of the show, resulting in reduced alcohol consumption during production and the removal of some intense scenes. The contestants were selected from the shows Rock of Love, I Love New York, Real Chance of Love, For the Love of Ray J, Daisy of Love, and Megan Wants a Millionaire. They competed in physical and mental challenges in an attempt to win $250,000. The show premiered on September 16, 2010 under the name of just I Love Money, with Craig J. Jackson as the host. The winner was Rock of Love's Mindy Hall.
