= Flavor of Love =

Television series

- Created by: Cris Abrego; Mark Cronin
- Starring: Flavor Flav
- Country of origin: United States
- No. of seasons: 3
- No. of episodes: 39

Production
- Executive producers: Cris Abrego; Mark Cronin; Ben Samek
- Running time: 60 minutes
- Production company: 51 Minds Entertainment

Original release
- Network: VH1
- Release: January 1, 2006 – May 26, 2008

Related
- I Love New York; Flavor of Love Girls: Charm School

Flavor of Love is an American reality television dating game show starring Flavor Flav of the rap group Public Enemy.

== Description ==
While not a direct spin-off, the show was a result of Brigitte Nielsen and Flavor Flav's failed relationship on Strange Love, as well as The Surreal Life. Those two series as well as Flavor of Love (seasons 1–2 only) have aired in repeats on TV Guide Network. The third season of Flavor of Love premiered on February 11, 2008 at 9/8c.

On May 14, 2008, it was announced that Flavor of Love 3 would be the final Flavor of Love. After 3 seasons, Flavor Flav chose to not marry or date any of the winners from any of the three seasons. Instead, it was revealed that he would marry Liz, the mother of his seventh child, Karma, on the season 3 reunion show.

The show was a ratings success for VH1. The Flavor of Love 2 finale was the second highest-rated non-sports basic cable show of 2006.

== Show format ==
The show was part of VH1's Celeb-reality lineup and its format is similar to that of The Bachelor. Twenty different ladies compete for Flavor Flav's heart as they live together in a mansion in Encino, California. He is helped in his quest by his bodyguard and chauffeur named "Big Rick." He was also assisted by his mother, as well as his former romantic partner Brigitte Nielsen in the first season, and Tiffany Pollard in the second. The show also helped spin off a string of similar VH1 "Love" shows, including I Love New York, Rock of Love with Bret Michaels, and Real Chance of Love. There were secondary spin-off shows featuring contestants on Flavor of Love, such as Flavor of Love Girls: Charm School, and I Love Money.

In the show, each contestant is given a nickname by Flav and is referred to by that nickname for as long as she remains in the competition, as Flav says he can remember nicknames more so than real names. Flavor of Love features a clock ceremony where contestants who are not eliminated receive gold clocks to wear around their necks with their picture and nickname behind the hands of the clock. When a contestant is eliminated, her real name is then revealed, followed by a champagne toast.

There were a few basic elements of the show's format that remained consistent through each season of production. Throughout the season the contestants competed for intimate dates with Flav by competing in various challenges. Also, Flav brought the few remaining women's parents on in the third or second to last episode. Finally, the season finale took place in a tropical destination. The two finalists and Flav spent the last two days at a luxurious resort preceding his final decision.

The week following the finale an all-cast reunion was typically aired. The host, La La Vazquez, spent this time reviewing the most memorable moments and interviewing the contestants after they had seen the season. This was also when the viewer found out if Flav was still with the woman he chose and what they had been up to since the season wrapped.

VH1 also introduced an internet component into the show. Viewers could create profiles, interact with contestants and other fans, and stay current with news at flavorofloveworld.com. In season 3, fans even got to vote online to elect five of the contestants, though Flav sent four of them home in the premiere episode.

== Series overview ==
Season	Premiere date	Winner	Runner-up	Other contestants in order of elimination	Number of contestants	International destinations
1	January 1, 2006	Nicole Alexander	Tiffany Pollard	April Navarro & Amber Kemp & Johanna Olson & Sarah Louise Wilson & Mieko Smith, Jefandi Cato & Thela Brown & Margaret Heinzeroth & Melanie Prudhomme & Xotchitl Rodriguez, Kim Manning & Cristal Steverson, Tika Rainn, Abigail Kintanar (quit), Schatar Taylor & Leilene Ondrade, Courtney Jackson, Brooke Thompson	20	Puerto Vallarta
2	August 6, 2006	Chandra Davis	Tiffany Pollard	Saaphyri Windsor (disqualified) & Bonnie Mercado & Alkeisha Phillips & Tarashai Lee & Ronnise Clark & Renee Austin, Maria Dunbar & Jesselynn Desmond, Tykeisha Thomas & Britnay Morano & Jasmine Dare (quit), Jennifer Toof, Darra Boyd, Domenique Majors & Kelly Jenkins & Becky Johnston (quit), Shay Johnson, Larissa Hodge, Heather Crawford	20	Placencia
3	February 11, 2008	LaTresha Hall	Candace Cabrera	Esperanza Bloom & Angela & Savanna Stidwell & Christa Hildenburg & Erika Louis, Courtney Dee & Lisa, Earaina Mixon & Amanda Habrowsk, Yvonne Govan, Twana Denard, Angela Pitts & Courtney Lynn, MonaLisa Brown, Mercedes Clausen, Nicole Essigman & Shannon Kulis, LaTrisha Hall & Maria Geiger, Rashida Shaw, Autumn Joi, Nicole Featherston	25	Paris; Cannes; Monaco

^{^[a]} One supposed contestant, "Eyez," was actually an impostor hired by the producers. "New York's" re-entry into the competition officially increased the contestant count to 20.
^{^[b]} Although there were 21 contestants originally, there were only 20 clocks, as two contestants, "Thing 1" and "Thing 2", shared a clock. Also, nearly halfway through the season, 4 new contestants were brought to compete. On episode 8, Flav split up the twins.

== Cast ==
Flavor Flav

William Jonathan Drayton Jr. (Flavor Flav of the rap group Public Enemy) is the bachelor looking for love.

Hoopz

Nicole Deannae Alexander is the winner of the first season. After the show, she started acting and modeling. Hoopz and Flavor Flav broke up soon after the show ended. She has since gone on to compete in the VH1 series I Love Money, winning the grand prize of $250,000. She dated Shaquille O'Neal.

Deelishis

Chandra Davis is the winner of the second season. She has her own line of jeans called D-Cut, and participated in a 2009 national tour of the Vagina Monologues with an all-black cast, most of whom are also former reality show contestants. Davis also appeared on I Love Money 3 along with Buckeey.

Thing 2

LaTresha Hall is the winner of the third season. Tresha entered the competition with her sister Trisha (Thing 1, who was eliminated after the "Never-Wed Challenge"). Although LaTresha eliminated in episode 12, she was brought back in episode 13, and subsequently won the competition. She was dumped on the reunion show when Flav decided to reunite with Liz, the mother of his son Karma.

Elizabeth "Liz" Trujillo

The mother of Flav's youngest child, Karma. Flav said she was the right one the whole time and proposed to her on the reunion show of Season 3.

Big Rick

Big Rick is Flavor's assistant and bodyguard. He and Flav met in 2004 while in Las Vegas at the Hard Rock Hotel Casino while shooting for Flav's other show, Strange Love. Big Rick used to work at a detention facility in Florida.

New York

Tiffany Pollard was the runner up of both the first and the second seasons. After the show, she appeared on her own reality dating show, I Love New York, which aired for two seasons, as well as New York Goes to Hollywood and New York Goes to Work.

Pumkin

Brooke Thompson finished in third-place on the first season. She gained notoriety after spitting on Tiffany Pollard shortly after her elimination. After the show, she received the Best Fight Award (with Pollard) at the Fox Reality Awards in 2006. She now has a clothing line called Pumkin Apparel, which includes a shirt that reads "Pumkin spit on me and I like it..."

She appeared on Flavor of Love Girls: Charm School and I Love Money. She has also appeared on Judge Jeanine Pirro, the Family Feud as a member of the Gardiner family, and Playboy TV's "Foursome" in 2009.

Saaphyri

Saaphyri Windsor was disqualified in the first episode of season 2 after assaulting another contestant. After the show, she appeared on Flavor of Love Girls: Charm School, winning the competition. She currently has her own lip balm line called Lip Chap and her own brand of weave hair called Saaphyri's Ultimate Indian Hair. She placed fifth on VH1's I Love Money 2. While it is noted that Windsor holds the record for being the only contestant in the series that did not receive a nickname, there was another contestant on season 3 whose nickname was her actual name, Savanna.

Buckwild

Becky Johnston appeared on Flavor of Love 2. She threw her shoe at Tiffany Pollard during the After the Lovin' reunion, almost hitting New York. After the show, she appeared on Flavor of Love Girls: Charm School and I Love Money 2.

Toasteee

Jennifer Toof appeared on Flavor of Love 2 where she was eliminated on the show's fourth episode after Flav discovered she had posed in a pornographic magazine. After the show, she appeared on Flavor of Love Girls: Charm School and the first season of I Love Money.

Black

Candace Cabrera is the runner-up on the third season.

Bootz

Larissa Hodge appeared on Flavor of Love 2. After the show, she appeared on Flavor of Love Girls: Charm School. Later on, during the show's reunion special, she got into an argument with Charm School's "headmistress"' actress Mo'Nique. In Flavor of Love season 2 she finished in fourth place.

Buckeey

Shay Johnson appeared on Flavor of Love 2. After the show, she appeared on Flavor of Love Girls: Charm School. Then later was a contestant on the unaired third season of I Love Money 3, along with Deelishis.

Myammee

Angela "Myammee" Pitts appeared on Flavor of Love 3. After the show, she won I Love Money 2.

Hottie

Schatar Taylor appeared on Flavor of Love, where she gained notoriety for trying to microwave a raw chicken and delusionally believing that she looked like Beyoncé. After the show, she appeared on Flavor of Love Girls: Charm School.

Serious

Cristal Steverson appeared on Flavor of Love. After the show, she appeared on Flavor of Love Girls: Charm School and worked as a temporary radio personality for Hot 107.9, where she interviewed Crunk&B trio, Taurus.

Smiley

Leilene Ondrade appeared on Flavor of Love. After the show, she was the runner-up of Flavor of Love Girls: Charm School and later appeared on I Love Money 2.

Wire

Jesselynn Desmond appeared on Flavor of Love 2. After the show, she appeared on the VH1 Big Awards.

Like Dat

Darra Boyd appeared on Flavor of Love 2. After the show, she appeared on Flavor of Love Girls: Charm School.

Krazy

Heather Crawford appeared on Flavor of Love 2. After the show, she appeared on Flavor of Love Girls: Charm School. In Flavor of Love season 2 she finished in third place.

Goldie

Courtney Jackson appeared on Flavor of Love. After the show, she appeared on Flavor of Love Girls: Charm School. In Flavor of Love season 1 she finished in fourth place.

Rain

Thela Brown appeared on Flavor of Love. After the show, she was the first contestant to get expelled on Flavor of Love Girls: Charm School.

Nibblz

Domenique Majors appeared on Flavor of Love 2. After the show, she appeared on the first season of I Love Money, where she was eliminated on the second episode, placing sixteenth.

== Direct spin-offs ==
=== I Love New York ===
After the second season of Flavor of Love, VH1 first aired a spin-off series entitled I Love New York, featuring the twice rejected Flavorette Tiffany "New York" Pollard. The first season premiered in January 2007, following a similar format to The Bachelorette and Flavor of Love. After the first season concluded, a second season premiered in October of the same year.

=== Charm School ===
The first season, Flavor of Love Girls: Charm School, premiered on April 15, 2007, featuring 13 contestants from the first two seasons of Flavor of Love. The contestants strive to develop proper etiquette and to become strong women, with the ultimate prize of $50,000 and the title of "Charm School Queen". Season 2, Rock of Love: Charm School, premiered on October 12, 2008, featuring contestants from Rock of Love with Bret Michaels. Season 3, Charm School with Ricki Lake, premiered May 11, 2009, featuring contestants from Real Chance of Love and Rock of Love Bus. Seasons 2 and 3 doubled the prize money to $100,000.

=== I Love Money ===
A number of contestants from Flavor of Love, Real Chance of Love, Rock of Love with Bret Michaels and I Love New York are brought together in a mansion in Huatulco, Mexico to compete in a co-ed battle of mental and physical challenges to win $250,000. The first season's winner was Nicole "Hoopz" Alexander. The second season's winner was Angela "Myammee" Pitts. The fourth winner was Mindy Hall. The canceled third season winner was Ryan Jenkins, but it has never aired.

== See also ==
- Who Wants to Marry a Multi-Millionaire? (2000)
- Age of Love (2007)
- Rock of Love with Bret Michaels (2007)
