= I Love New York season 2 =

I Love New York
- Season 2
- The cast of I Love New York 2
- Starring: Tiffany Pollard
- No. of episodes: 13

Release
- Original network: VH1
- Original release: October 8, 2007 – January 6, 2008

Season chronology
- ← Previous; Season 1

I Love New York 2 is the second season of the VH1 reality television series I Love New York. I Love New York 2 starred Tiffany "New York" Pollard who was on a quest to find her true love. Her relationship with season one's Victor, Tango, ended shortly after the season concluded. Unlike the first season, Mauricio Sanchez did not return as "Chamo", New York's assistant. Instead of "Chamo", New York had "Big Ant" (Anthony) as her assistant, and "Bodyguard". The show premiered on October 8, 2007, and featured twenty men competing to be the winner.

The runner up of season two was Ezra "Buddha" Masters who was defeated by George "Tailor Made" Weisgerber III. As of August 2008, Pollard and Weisgerber are no longer together.

== Contestants ==
Nickname	Real Name	Hometown	Eliminated	Place
Tailor Made	George Weisgerber	Queens, New York	Winner	1
Buddha	Ezra Masters	Miami, Florida	Episode 12	2
Punk	David Otunga	Elgin, Illinois	Episode 10	3
The Entertainer	Frank Maresca	Congers, New York	Episode 9	4
Mr. Wise	Solomon Wise	Camden, New Jersey	Episode 8	5
Pretty	Juan McCullum	Pearl, Mississippi	Episode 7	6 (Quit)
Wolf	Greg Harris	Texas	Episode 6	7
It	Kwame Smalls	Long Island City, New York	Episode 5	8-9
Midget Mac	Torrey Samuels	Jacksonville, Florida	Episode 5	8-9
20 Pack	Nico Vasquez	Orlando, Florida	Episode 4	10
Cheezy	Matthew Levy	Cherry Hill, New Jersey	Episode 3	11-12
Man Man	Collin Anthony Vickers	East Hazel Crest, Illinois	Episode 3	11-12
Knock Out	Deandre Allberry	Detroit, Michigan	Episode 2	13-15
Yours	Lafayette Brown	Jacksonville, Florida	Episode 2	13-15
Unsure	Jared Roberts	New Jersey	Episode 2	13-15 (Quit)
Champion	Jimmy Houston	Paducah, Kentucky	Episode 1	16-20
Doc	Dwight Holliday	Philadelphia, Pennsylvania	Episode 1	16-20
Ears	David Cuevas	Fountain Valley, California	Episode 1	16-20
Sweetie Pie	Darnell Wright	Atlanta, Georgia	Episode 1	16-20
Milliown	Jamal Trulove	Oakland, California	Episode 1	16-20

^[a] Buddha was eliminated in Episode 4 for violence, was brought back in Episode 5, and was runner up.

== Elimination order ==
New York's Call-out Order
#	Contestants	Episodes										
#	Contestants	1	2	3	4	5	6	7	8	9	10	12
1	20 Pack	Entertainer	Buddha^{1}	Tailor Made^{2}	Mr. Wise^{1}	Punk^{2}	Tailor Made	Buddha	Punk	Tailor Made	Tailor Made	Tailor Made
2	Buddha	Pretty	Midget Mac ^{2}	It^{1}	Entertainer	Tailor Made	Buddha^{2}	Entertainer	Tailor Made	Punk	Buddha	Buddha
3	Cheezy	Buddha	Entertainer	Punk	It	Mr. Wise	Punk	Mr. Wise	Entertainer^{2}	Buddha	Punk	
4	Doc	Mr. Wise	Man Man	Buddha	Midget Mac	Pretty	Entertainer	Punk	Buddha	Entertainer		
5	It	Man Man	Punk	Midget Mac	Pretty	Wolf	Pretty	Tailor Made	Mr. Wise			
6	Knock Out	Wolf	Cheezy	Pretty	Punk	Entertainer	Mr. Wise	Pretty				
7	Man Man	Yours	Mr. Wise	20 Pack	Tailor Made	Buddha	Wolf^{2}					
8	Midget Mac	20 Pack	20 Pack	Wolf	Wolf	It						
9	Unsure	Punk	Pretty	Mr. Wise	20 Pack^{1}	Midget Mac						
10	Wolf	Cheezy	Wolf	Entertainer	Buddha							
11	Champion	Tailor Made^{1}	It	Cheezy^{1}								
12	Pretty	Knock Out	Tailor Made^{1}	Man Man								
13	Punk	Unsure	Yours									
14	Tailor Made	It	Knock Out									
15	Yours	Midget Mac	Unsure									
16	Ears	Sweetie Pie										
17	Entertainer	Ears										
18	Milliown	Doc										
19	Mr. Wise	Champion										
20	Sweetie Pie	Milliown										

The contestant won the competition
The contestant was chosen by New York's mother
The contestant was chosen by producers
The contestant was chosen by internet viewers
The contestant received a chain before the elimination ceremony.
The contestant voluntarily left the competition
The contestant was disqualified
The contestant was brought back into the competition
The contestant was eliminated

- ^{1} The contestant won a group date with New York.
- ^{2} The contestant won a solo date with New York.

Episode 4 is in alphabetical order because there was no elimination order due to violence, with the exception of Mr. Wise who in fact did receive a chain.
Episode 7 is also in alphabetical order because Pretty voluntarily left the show before the elimination. Thus, there was no elimination order because no other contestants were eliminated.
Episode 11 is a clip-show entitled I Love New York: The Recap With Benefits.

== Episodes ==
=== Let's Do It Again! ===
First aired October 8, 2007

New York is back for a brand new season with 20 new men. This season, things are different and New York has picked 5 men from the internet, Sister Patterson has also picked 5 men called the "mama's boys". During the mixer, some suitors make a bad impression to New York and her mother. Wolf reveals that he has a big penis causing New York to laugh, and say shes quote, "feeling a little horny", but pisses Sister Patterson off. At elimination, New York eliminates 5 men Sweetie Pie, Champion, Milliown, Ears, and, Doc were eliminated. 3 out of 5 men who were picked on the internet were eliminated on the first night, 1 was from the "mama's boys", and 1 was picked by producers.

- Eliminated: Sweetie Pie, Champion, Milliown, Ears, Doc

=== Flowers From Fishburne ===
First aired October 15, 2007 (3.2M viewers)

Now down to 15 men, New York invites the guys to a pond where they must prove their love by swimming to her and presenting her with a gift. The guys who make the best impressions will receive dates with New York. Midget Mac nearly drowned after his flotation device popped and Buddha saved him. When the guys find out that one of their housemates is "re-gifting", they proceed to tell NY about it. In true New York fashion, she lets the poor guy have it. Will he be one of the three to be eliminated, or will he squirm his way out of the mouth of danger? Meanwhile, a huge controversy arises when one suitor intercepts another man's flowers for NY, and presents them as his own. The only thing better than the drama is his story of where the flowers came from. Unsure decided to quit the competition because the jacket that he gave to New York wasn't for her, instead was for his sister and the other guys got upset about this and told this to New York and he told her that he won't be with people who don't do the right thing but he remains in the house until the elimination where New York threw his jacket and kicked him off very angrily. After this she sent home "Yours" because he spent all the time sleeping and he drew an unflattering picture of New York, this upset Sister Patterson because Yours was a "Mama's boy". She also sent home Knock Out because of his looks and his violent tendencies.

- Challenge: Swim across a pond and present New York with a present.
- Challenge Winners: Buddha, Midget Mac, Tailor Made
- Eliminated: Yours, Knock Out
- Withdrew: Unsure

=== The Stolen Date ===
First aired October 22, 2007

With 12 guys left, some of the boys play a prank on a few of the "less popular" men that keeps them up all night. The sleep deprived few head into the days challenge a complete mess, but will the prank-ees have the last laugh at the end of the day? Wanting a man who can help build her financial empire, NY asks the boys to create a marketing plan to build her brand name. Some ideas are legitimate and professional and some are off the charts. Later, one of the guys from the winning team steals a private date with New York away from his teammate. The result is an angry house waiting for the back-stabber on his return. The following day, during a fashion photo shoot, someone gets down on his knees to impress New York. New York may have to send home more than one man. Man Man and Cheezy were both eliminated.

- Challenge: Create a plan for New York's empire.
- Teams

- Blue: Wolf, Buddha, 20 Pack
- Green: Mr. Wise, Punk, Pretty
- Yellow: Midget Mac, Man Man, The Entertainer
- Red: It, Cheezy, Tailor Made

- Challenge Winners: It, Cheezy, Tailor Made
- Eliminated: Cheezy, Man Man

=== Nobody Likes A Snitch ===
First aired October 29, 2007

New York has barely wiped the morning out of her eyes when an act of violence breaks out, in which Buddha bullies and assaults Tailor Made. Although NY can be a tolerant person, violence is non-negotiable, and she is faced with the tough decision to let Buddha go. The other men in the house are pissed off to see Buddha go, and Tailor Made stay, when he has been known to be manipulative and conniving. Eager to see how the other boys deal with aggression, NY brings them to a Muy Thai gym, where she tests their ability to take a good old-fashioned beating with a new-fashioned twist. The team that handles the challenge the best wins a date with NY. Back at the mansion, tensions rise as a "snitch" is revealed among the men. This "snitch" will stop at nothing to get ahead and ultimately win NY's heart. During her double date, NY reveals some gossip she heard from this source. Things come to a real heat when the guys confront Tailor Made back at the house. Before the night is over, curses, heated threats, and gross injustices are exchanged. A fight between Tailor Made and Mr. Wise breaks out, in which Tailor Made spits on Mr. Wise. When Tailor Made confesses this to New York, she is pissed because she gets a flashback to when Pumkin spat on her in Flavor of Love (season 1) . New York is confronted with yet another act of violence under her roof. In the end, 20 pack is eliminated. New York refused to eliminate Tailor Made, because she was afraid that if she did, she would later regret it, because Tailor Made had mad love for her.

- Disqualified: Buddha
- Challenge: Team that performs the best in the boxing match wins.
- Teams

- Pink: The Entertainer, Wolf
- Yellow: Punk, Pretty
- Black: It, Midget Mac
- Blue: Tailor Made
- Red: Mr. Wise, 20 Pack

- Challenge Winners: Mr. Wise, 20 Pack
- Eliminated: 20 Pack

=== Blood Oath Gone Bad ===
First aired November 5, 2007 (3.5M viewers)

After snitching, fighting, and spitting, and nearly getting eliminated, Tailor Made is the house enemy and anxiously waits for an opportunity to redeem himself. The guys find out the next challenge will involve an offering and a blood oath to test their devotion to their goddess New York. When "It" refuses to sign, and another signs an oath that includes obvious lies, New York is left worried about who she can really trust. Later that night there are some strange events in the house, which are hard to explain and make everyone wonder just how powerful spirits and lies can be. A visit from Sister Patterson ends in an argument with The Entertainer, putting him on thin ice. At the elimination, New York eliminates Midget Mac because she thinks he needs more time to overcome the loss of his deceased wife and time to be with his children. She also eliminates It, accusing him of being a fake and too crazy and dumb for her, and being the only one to not sign the blood oath, which made him distrustful. The guys are in for an even bigger surprise when she brings Buddha back.

- Challenge: Offer something sentimental to New York and sign a blood oath.
- Challenge Winner: Punk
- Eliminated: It, Midget Mac
- Brought Back: Buddha

=== Nip/Suck ===
First aired November 12, 2007

New York surprises the guys with the return of Buddha. Tailor Made is unhappy as his world is suddenly turned upside down and he fears for his life. Later, the guys compete in a cooking challenge run by Season 1 favorite, "Mr. Boston". New York must endure tasting the boys' cooking. New York also gets a guest spot on the show "Nip/Tuck," and she takes Wolf along to keep her company. At the set, Wolf in the trailer farts so loud it wakes New York up. He blames this fart on the tuna she fed him, saying it tasted like a "cow tongue". She was very shocked by this but on set she surprisingly remembered her lines. At eliminations, she let Wolf go, claiming he was too much of a "country bumpkin". Jokingly, she said before he left, "We can get some ribs together or whatever y'all do in Texas."

- Challenge: Cook a meal for New York.
- Challenge Winners: Buddha, Wolf
- Eliminated: Wolf

=== I Still Have Love For New York ===
First aired November 19, 2007 (4.39M viewers)

New York invites the remaining six guys' exes to the house and this time, there's a special twist involved. She's bringing two of her exes, Chance and Real, to help dig up some dirt on her guys. The only problem is that feelings resurface when the old flame admits he still has serious feelings for New York. When her "new" guys catch wind of this, all hell breaks loose. Later on, Pretty quits the competition because of the interrogating his sister received and New York asking her way too personal questions regarding his sexuality. At eliminations, no one was eliminated as a result of Pretty leaving the mansion.

- Withdrew: Pretty

=== Mind Games ===
First aired November 26, 2007

With five guys left, New York wants to find out who's the most compatible with her and who's just plain crazy when she takes the boys for a psych test. Things get tense when it is revealed that one of the guys, who has been frustrating New York with mind games, may be using her to further his acting career. Her feelings for this person are thrown even more up in the air. After the test, the most compatible guy wins a date with New York and discovers that three's a crowd at an exotic restaurant. The next day, New York brings her boys to see her therapist, renowned relationship author Dr. Allen, for a session of couple's counseling. Here, New York discovers that the individual she secretly has the strongest emotions for is the one who also has been frustrating her the most. Also, Buddha is accused of being on a BET show called Hell Date. New York questions him, and Buddha tells her that he is indeed on the show, and she becomes infuriated with this information she received. Later, The Entertainer, the winner of the challenge, goes on a date with her. Back at the house, the guys play a prank on The Entertainer, and he plays a trick himself by pretending to leave. After the jokes, it was eliminations where Mr. Wise was sent home for not being aggressive enough.

- Challenge: Take a psych test.
- Challenge Winners: The Entertainer
- Eliminated: Mr. Wise

=== Meet The Parents ===
First aired December 3, 2007

With only four guys left, it is time to clean house. New York has invited some special guests - the guy's parents, so she gets her boys to scour and scrub her house for their arrival. Upon meeting her possible future in-laws it doesn't take long for New York to realize that these apples don't fall very far from the tree. While some parents are instantly in awe by New York, it takes others a little longer to warm up to her. Later, New York takes two of the families out to dinner, but before they can even break bread, all hell breaks loose, when Sister Patterson says mean things to the Entertainers mother about her son. Hoping to make the next family outing a bit calmer, New York stays closer to home, but again is unable to create a happy family reunion. In the end, New York learns a very valuable lesson: You can't choose your family, but you can choose your lover and his family. Possible in-laws become outlaws as The Entertainer is sent packing because New York claims that he is a "loser" for the fact that he lives with his parents, and that he is so cheap.

- Dates

- The Entertainer & Punk: Dinner date with family.
- Buddha & Tailor Made: Date in the backyard with family.

- Eliminated: The Entertainer

=== Miami Thrice ===
First aired December 10, 2007

After the last elimination, New York tells her final three men to pack their bags because they're heading to Miami. Miami is a party city, but things quickly get serious when New York invites one man to spend some alone time in her beachfront villa room the first night, leaving the other two shocked and angry. As New York spends quality time with each man, she starts to realize that two of these guys are totally devoted and in love with her while one is manipulative and hard to trust. At elimination New York must decide whether to listen to her mind or her heart and lets Punk go for not being aggressive enough. Punk is eliminated, and both Punk and Sister Paterson question her decision. Sister Patterson says to New York, "You're dead meat, girl!" indicating that she believes that New York made the wrong choice for herself.

- Eliminated: Punk

=== Clip Show ===
First aired December 12, 2007

A catch up with New York, with bonus scenes not aired on TV.

=== Rasta Finale ===
First aired December 17, 2007 (5.4M viewers)

- Winner: Tailor Made
- Runner-Up: Buddha

=== Reunion Show ===
First aired January 6, 2008 (4.86M viewers)

All of the men (except Unsure who didn't show up) are back to talk about this season with New York and Sister Paterson. Where New York accepts Tailor Made's proposal.

== Viewer participation ==
Fans of I Love New York were encouraged to choose 5 of the 20 contestants for the second season. New York has stated the men should be from 21–36 years of age, and straight, believed to be a recommendation because of questioned sexual orientation of some first season contestants (in reference to 12 Pack and Heat). A VH1 special on October 1, 2007 revealed the 5 men with the most votes. The five men who were chosen as the contestants are above on the elimination chart in the color yellow.

== DVD release ==
The I Love New York: The Complete Unrated Second Season DVD was released June 3, 2008 along with the Flavor of Love 3. All episodes including the casting and reunion specials were on it, and a supertrailer.
