= Fox Reality Awards =

Reality television awards show

The Fox Reality Awards is an awards show to honor achievements in reality television. It was broadcast by the Fox Reality Channel from 2006 to 2009 when the channel was replaced in 2010 by National Geographic Wild.

== Awards list ==
=== 2006 ===
| Favorite Fight | Favorite Pottymouth |
|---|---|
| Brooke "Pumkin" Thompson vs Tiffany "New York" Pollard – Flavor of Love; Jonny Fairplay vs Victoria Fuller and Jonathan Baker – Fear Factor: Reality All-Stars; Howie Gordon vs Marcellas Reynolds – Big Brother: All-Stars; Janice Dickinson vs Omarosa Manigault-Stallworth – The Surreal Life; Danny Bonaduce vs Dr. Garry Corgiatt – Breaking Bonaduce | Janice Dickinson – The Surreal Life; Adrianne Curry – My Fair Brady; Jeff Conaway – Celebrity Fit Club; Danny Bonaduce – Breaking Bonaduce |
| Favorite Tears | Favorite Showmance |
| Andrae Gonzalo – Project Runway; Storm Large – Rock Star: Supernova; The Godlewski Sisters – The Amazing Race: Family Edition; Moana Dixon – The Bachelor: Paris; Jonathan Antin – Blow Out; Adrianne Curry – My Fair Brady | Mike "Boogie" Malin and Will Kirby – Big Brother: All-Stars; Cher Tenbush and Wes Wilson – Beauty and the Geek; Suzy and Matt Hoover – The Biggest Loser; Kristy Swanson and Lloyd Eisler – Skating With Celebrities; Mike Boogie Malin and Erika Landin – Big Brother: All-Stars |
| Favorite Winner | Favorite Hottie |
| B. J. Averell and Tyler MacNiven – The Amazing Race; Aras Baskauskas – Survivor: Exile Island; Josh Blue – Last Comic Standing; Mike "Boogie" Malin – Big Brother: All-Stars | Katharine McPhee – American Idol; Storm Large – Rock Star: Supernova; J. P. Calderon – Survivor: Cook Islands; Janelle Pierzina – Big Brother: All-Stars; Erika Landin – Big Brother: All-Stars |
| Favorite Villain | Favorite Judge |
| Tiffany "New York" Pollard – Flavor of Love; Santino Rice – Project Runway; Omarosa Manigault-Stallworth – The Surreal Life 5; Will Kirby – Big Brother: All-Stars | Carrie Ann Inaba – Dancing with the Stars; Miss J Alexander – America's Next Top Model; Mary Murphy – So You Think You Can Dance; Little Richard – Celebrity Duets; Simon Cowell – American Idol |
| Favorite Altered State | Favorite Competition Show |
| Lisa D'Amato – America's Next Top Model; Danny Bonaduce – Breaking Bonaduce; Katie Doyle – Real World/Road Rules Challenge: Fresh Meat; Christopher Knight – My Fair Brady | Flavor of Love; American Idol; The Amazing Race; Survivor: Exile Island; Project Runway; Big Brother: All-Stars |
| Favorite Non-Competition Show | Favorite Reality Show |
| The Real World: Key West; The Surreal Life; Laguna Beach: The Real Orange County; My Fair Brady; Extreme Makeover: Home Edition | American Idol; Dancing with the Stars; Survivor; Extreme Makeover: Home Edition |
Most Memorable Reality Performer
Jonny Fairplay – Survivor; Mike "Boogie" Malin – Big Brother 2 and Big Brother: All-Stars; B. J. Averell and Tyler MacNiven – The Amazing Race; Omarosa Manigault-Stallworth – The Apprentice and The Surreal Life; Janice Dickinson – America's Next Top Model, The Surreal Life and The Janice Dickinson Modeling Agency; Evan Marriott – Joe Millionaire; Toni Ferrari – Love Cruise and Paradise Hotel; Will Kirby – Big Brother 2 and Big Brother: All-Stars; Beth Stolarczyk – The Real World: Los Angeles and Real World/Road Rules Challenge; Flavor Flav – The Surreal Life, Strange Love and Flavor of Love

=== 2007 ===
| Favorite Fight | Favorite Pottymouth |
|---|---|
| Leilene "Smiley" Ondrade vs Brooke "Pumkin" Thompson – Flavor of Love Girls: Charm School; Kamal "Chance" Givens vs Lee "Mr. Boston" Marks – I Love New York; James Reid vs Andria "Dreamz" Herd – Survivor: Fiji; Sharon Osbourne vs Piers Morgan – America's Got Talent; Evel Dick Donato vs Jen Johnson – Big Brother 8; Saaphyri Windsor vs Renee "H-Town" Austin – Flavor of Love 2 | Adrianne Curry – My Fair Brady: We're Getting Married; Gordon Ramsay – Hell's Kitchen; Dustin Diamond – Celebrity Fit Club; Evel Dick Donato – Big Brother 8 |
| Favorite Tears | Favorite Showmance |
| Amber Siyavus – Big Brother 8; Jen Johnson – Big Brother 8; Aaron Song – Hell's Kitchen; Paula Abdul – Hey Paula; Ashley Ferl – American Idol | Will Kirby and Mike "Boogie" Malin – Dr. 90210; Eric Stein and Jessica Hughbanks – Big Brother 8; Nate Dern and Jenny Lee Berns – Beauty and the Geek; Jackie Warner and Rebecca Cardon – Work Out; CT Tamburello and Diem Brown – Real World/Road Rules Challenge; Danielle Donato and Nick Starcevic – Big Brother 8 |
| Favorite Winner | Favorite Loser |
| Rahman "Rock" Harper – Hell's Kitchen; Tyler Denk and James Branaman – The Amazing Race; Evel Dick Donato – Big Brother 8; Traci Bingham – The Surreal Life: Fame Games; Yul Kwon – Survivor: Cook Islands | Sanjaya Malakar – American Idol; Bonnie Muirhead – Hell's Kitchen; Ian Ziering – Dancing with the Stars; David and Mary Conley – The Amazing Race; Ron Jeremy – The Surreal Life: Fame Games; Yau-Man Chan – Survivor: Fiji |
| Favorite Hottie | Favorite Villain |
| Bridget Marquardt – The Girls Next Door; Jen Johnson – Big Brother 8; Brooke Hogan – Hogan Knows Best; J. P. Calderon – The Janice Dickinson Modeling Agency; Molly Shea and Holly Huddleston – Sunset Tan; Bob Harper – The Biggest Loser | Evel Dick Donato – Big Brother 8; Dustin Diamond – Celebrity Fit Club; Cecille Gahr – Beauty and the Geek; Johnny Venokur – Scott Baio Is 45...and Single; Renee Alway – America's Next Top Model; Larissa "Bootz" Aurora – Flavor of Love Girls: Charm School |
| Favorite Judge | Favorite Altered State |
| Mary Murphy – So You Think You Can Dance; Ant – Celebrity Fit Club; Len Goodman – Dancing with the Stars; Phil Keoghan – The Amazing Race; Ryan Seacrest – American Idol; Donald Trump – The Apprentice; Carrie Ann Inaba – Dancing with the Stars | Frank Roessler – Reunited: The Real World Las Vegas; Jason "Heat" Rosell – I Love New York; Ripsi Terzian – The Bad Girls Club; Brooke "Pumkin" Thompson – Flavor of Love Girls: Charm School |
| Baddest Bitch | Favorite Moment of Pray |
| Brooke "Pumkin" Thompson – Flavor of Love Girls: Charm School; Renee Alway – America's Next Top Model; Jillian Michaels – The Biggest Loser; Arissa Hill – Reunited: The Real World Las Vegas; Cecille Gahr – Beauty and the Geek | Jameka Cameron – Big Brother 8; Saaphyri Windsor – Flavor of Love Girls: Charm School; Duane "Dog" Chapman – Dog the Bounty Hunter; Amber Siyavus – Big Brother 8; Michelle Sister Patterson – I Love New York |
| Favorite Competition Show | Favorite Non-Competition Show |
| So You Think You Can Dance; Hell's Kitchen; Big Brother; I Love New York; The Biggest Loser; Survivor | Scott Baio Is 45...and Single; The Real World; My Fair Brady: We're Getting Married; The Deadliest Catch; The Hills; Criss Angel Mindfreak |
| Favorite Reality Show | Most Memorable Reality Performer |
| American Idol; Survivor; Dancing with the Stars; America's Got Talent; Big Brother; Extreme Makeover: Home Edition | Evel Dick Donato – Big Brother 8; Adrianne Curry and Christopher Knight – The Surreal Life and My Fair Brady; Sanjaya Malakar – American Idol; Tiffany "New York" Pollard – Flavor of Love, Flavor of Love 2 and I Love New York; Len Goodman – Dancing with the Stars; Ant – Celebrity Fit Club |

=== 2008 ===
| Favorite Pottymouth | Favorite Villain |
|---|---|
| Jeff Conaway – Celebrity Rehab; Heather Chadwell – Rock of Love 2; Daisy de la Hoya – Rock of Love 2; Snoop Dogg – Snoop Dogg's Fatherhood; Kathy Griffin – My Life on the D-List | Greg Halstead – The Real World: Hollywood; Omarosa – Celebrity Apprentice; Dunbar Flinn – The Real World: Sydney; Johnny Venokur – Scott Baio Is 45...and Single; Nicole Williams – The Mole |
| Favorite Altered State | Favorite Throwdown |
| Erin Moran – Celebrity Fit Club; Jessica Kinni – Rock of Love 2; Jennavecia Russo – The Bad Girls Club; Pretty Ricky – From G's to Gents; Bobby Brown – Gone Country | Bo Kunkle vs. Chad Tulik – A Shot at Love II with Tila Tequila; Lee "Mr. Boston" Marks vs. Joshua "White Boy" Gallander – I Love Money; Heather Chadwell vs. Daisy de la Hoya – Rock of Love 2; Ezra "Buddha" Masters vs. George "Tailor Made" Weisgerber – I Love New York 2; Greg Halstead, Will Gilbert, and Dave Malinosky – The Real World: Hollywood; Brandi Ryan vs. Vanessa Romanelli – A Shot at Love with Tila Tequila |
| Favorite Hottie | Favorite Awkward Moment |
| Antonio Sabato, Jr. – Celebrity Circus; The Olly Girls/Holly Huddleston/Molly Shea – Sunset Tan; Brody Jenner – The Hills; Audrina Patridge – The Hills; Karina Smirnoff – Dancing with the Stars; Cristian de la Fuente – Dancing with the Stars; Lisa Byrnes – America's Most Smartest Model; Susie Feldman – The Two Coreys | Bret Michaels and Megan Hauserman – Rock of Love 2; Flavor Flav, Baby Mama/Liz, and Tresha/Thing 2 – Flavor of Love 3; Jake Perry and Corey Feldman – The Two Coreys; Jason Mesnick and DeAnna Pappas – The Bachelorette |
| Favorite Duo | Favorite Meltdown |
| Corey Feldman and Susie Feldman – The Two Coreys; Tori Spelling and Dean McDermott – Tori & Dean: Home Sweet Hollywood; Jeff Lewis and Jenni Poulos – Flipping Out; The Olly Girls/Holly Huddleston/Molly Shea – Sunset Tan; Deanna Pappas and Jessie Csinscak – The Bachelorette; Travis Brorsen and Pressley – Greatest American Dog | Melissa "Rocky" Brasselle – I Know My Kid's a Star; Lee "Mr. Boston" Marks – I Love Money; James Zinkand – Big Brother 9; Adrianne Curry – My Fair Brady: Maybe Baby?; Mark and Jay Kruger – The Biggest Loser |
| Favorite Non-Competition Show | Favorite Competition Show |
| The Deadliest Catch; Dog the Bounty Hunter; The Real World; The Hills; Tori & Dean: Home Sweet Hollywood; Keeping up with the Kardashians | So You Think You Can Dance; Survivor; The Amazing Race; Project Runway; Pussycat Dolls Present: Girlicious; Dancing with the Stars; America's Got Talent |
| Favorite Host | Favorite Performer of the Year |
| Jerry Springer – America's Got Talent; Ryan Seacrest – American Idol; Chris Harrison – The Bachelor and The Bachelorette; Jeff Probst – Survivor; Heidi Klum – Project Runway | DeAnna Pappas – The Bachelorette; Corey Feldman – The Two Coreys; Holly Madison – The Girls Next Door; Carrie Ann Inaba – Dancing with the Stars and Dance War: Bruno vs. Carrie Ann; Captain Sig Hansen – The Deadliest Catch |
America's Favorite
American Idol

=== 2009 ===
| Favorite Performer of the Year | OMG Moment |
|---|---|
| Terrell Owens – The TO Show; Joan Rivers – The Celebrity Apprentice; Hammer – Hammertime; Kim Zolciak – The Real Housewives of Atlanta; Antonio Sabato Jr – My Antonio | Spencer fights with Frangela – I'm a Celebrity... Get Me Out Of Here!; Danity Kane Breaks Up – Making the Band; Jason Dumps Melissa – The Bachelorette; Teresa Versus Danielle – The Real Housewives of New Jersey; Jon and Kate Break Up – Jon and Kate plus 8 |
| Favorite Hottie | Totally Robbed |
| Gretchen Rossi – The Real Housewives of Orange County; Audrina Patridge – The Hills; Ray J – For the Love of Ray J; Kim Kardashian – Keeping Up with the Kardashians; Antonio Sabato Jr – My Antonio; Karina Smirnoff – Dancing With the Stars | Mark Long – Real World/Road Rules Challenge: The Duel 2; Adam Lambert – American Idol; Tamara Johnson-George – Survivor: Tocantins; Jonathan Ward – Make Me a Supermodel; Tailor Made – I Love Money 2; Gilles Marini – Dancing With The Stars |
| Favorite Villain | Favorite Host or Judge |
| Wes Hayden – The Bachelorette; Spencer Pratt – I'm a Celebrity... Get Me Out Of Here!; Janice Dickenson – I'm a Celebrity... Get Me Out Of Here!; Chima Simone – Big Brother 11; Kim "Poprah" Kearney – I Want to Work for Diddy | Nigel Lythgoe – So You Think You Can Dance; Tom Bergeron – Dancing With the Stars; Ryan Seacrest – American Idol; Phil Keoghan – The Amazing Race; Jeff Probst – Survivor; Miss J – America's Next Top Model; Mary Ann Murphy – So You Think You Can Dance |
| Favorite Duo | Favorite Docu-series |
| Jeff Schroeder and Jordan Lloyd – Big Brother 11; Tori Spelling and Dean McDermott – Tori and Dean: Home Sweet Hollywood; Joan Rivers and Melissa Rivers – The Celebrity Apprentice; Tammy and Victor Jih – The Amazing Race; Tameka "Tiny" Cottle and Antonia "Toya" Carter – Tiny and Toya; Farrah Sinclair and Ashley – Charm School | Keeping Up with the Kardashians; Kathy Griffin: My Life on the D-list; Gene Simmons Family Jewels; The Hills; The Deadliest Catch; The Real World; Celebrity Rehab with Dr. Drew |
Favorite Competition Series
Dancing With The Stars; American Idol; Survivor; Top Chef; America's Got Talent; So You Think You Can Dance
Fashionista Award
Kim Zolciak
Innovator Award
Paris Hilton
Legend Award
Jonathan Murray
