= Saaphyri Windsor =

American reality television star

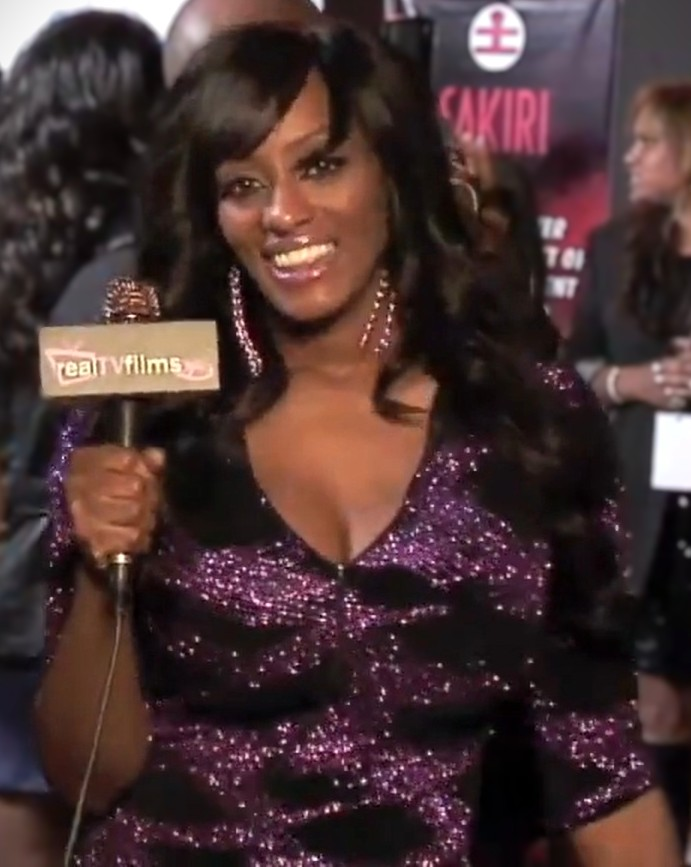
- Windsor in 2010
- Born: Wanda Scott; Los Angeles, California, U.S
- Occupation: Reality television star
- Years active: 2001–present
- Television: Flavor of Love, Flavor of Love Girls: Charm School, I Love Money
- Children: 1
- Website: http://saaphyri.wix.com/saaphyri

Saaphyri Windsor (born Wanda Scott) is an American reality television star, best known for her appearances on the hit VH1 celebreality shows Flavor of Love, Flavor of Love Girls: Charm School and I Love Money.

== Career ==
In 2005, Windsor filmed the pilot episode for the future Flavor of Love. In 2006, she appeared on the second season of the show as a contestant. Immediately after entering the house, she got into a physical altercation with fellow contestant Renee "H-Town" Austin, after Austin accused Windsor of stealing the bed she had claimed for herself. Austin then threw a bouquet of roses in Windsor's face. After the fight was pulled apart by Flavor Flav, Windsor infamously offered Austin "lip chap". Windsor was disqualified from the competition and sent home, less than an hour into filming.

In 2007, Windsor was a contestant on the VH1 celebreality spin-off, Flavor of Love Girls: Charm School, hosted by Mo'Nique. Windsor won the show, winning a $50,000 cash prize. She revealed during the reunion special that she had officially created and released her own line of lip balm called Saaphyri's Lip Chap. In 2009, she was a contestant on the second season of the VH1 celebreality spin-off, I Love Money. She placed fifth overall, being eliminated in the season finale after she placed last in the semi-final challenge.

Windsor went on to appear in various other television shows, including Comedy Central Roast, Hole in the Wall and Botched.

== Personal life ==
During the filming of the second season of Flavor of Love,Windsor was on the run from the law and had an active warrant out for her arrest. In January 2009, she was sentenced to three years in prison after failing to appear at a November 2005 court date for forgery charges. She served twenty months of her sentence and was officially released in August 2010.

In 2021, she was the victim of a death hoax. It was reported by multiple news sites that Windsor had died after a post was uploaded to her official social media pages. Windsor released a video statement proving she was alive and well, claiming a hacker had made the false post and apologizing for any upset caused.

== Filmography ==
Film and television
Year	Title	Role	Notes
2001	MacArthur Park	Jackie	
2002	Glam	Tiana	
2005-2006	The Tyra Banks Show	Self; interviewee	2 episodes
2006	Flavor of Love season 2	Self; contestant	21st place, disqualified, 2 episodes
2007	Flavor of Love: Charm School	Self; contestant	Winner, 12 episodes
2007	Socially Offensive Behavior	Self; interviewee	1 episode
2007	Reality Chat	Self; interviewee	1 episode
2007	Fox Reality Roundtable	Self; interviewee	1 episode
2007	Fox Reality Remix	Self; interviewee	1 episode
2007	Comedy Central Roast	Self; roaster	1 episode
2007	The Black Carpet	Self; cameo	TV special
2007	Baisden After Dark	Self; interviewee	1 episode
2007	VH1: All Access	Self; interviewee	1 episode
2007	Viva	Tribal Dancer	
2007	Ricky & Melinda	Shawntae	
2007	Flavor of Love: You Cast It!	Self; host	Web special
2008	Flavor of Love season 3	Self; guest judge	1 episode
2008	20 Greatest Celebreality Fights	Self; narrator	TV special
2008	Reality Obsessed	Self; interviewee	1 episode
2008	Hole in the Wall	Self; contestant	1 episode
2008	Angel Blade	Sister Valjean	Direct to DVD
2008	Friends & Lovers: The Ski Trip 2	Lisa	
2009	I Love Money season 2	Self; contestant	5th place, 15 episodes
2009	Busted	Niecy	
2010	The Bone Collector	Cheryl Williams	2 episodes
2010	Friends & Lovers	Lisa	8 episodes
2011	Holland in da Hood	Self, cameo	1 episode
2014	I Wanna Get Naked	Self; cameo	Web special
2014	Botched	Self; feature	1 episode
2020	Talk of Love	Self; interviewee	Web series, 2 episodes
2020	No Filter with Zack Peter	Self; interviewee	Web series, 1 episode
2024	Halfway House Series	Stephanie	1 episode
2025	Reality Check	Self; interviewee	1 episode

== Awards and accomplishments ==
Year	Award	Result	Category	Series
2007	Fox Reality Awards	Nominated	Favorite Fight	Flavor of Love 2
2007	Fox Reality Awards	Nominated	Favorite Moment of Prayer	Flavor of Love 2
