= Flavor of Love season 3 =

Flavor of Love
- Season 3
- The cast of Season 3 (4 not pictured)
- Starring: Flavor Flav
- No. of episodes: 16

Release
- Original network: VH1
- Original release: February 11 – May 26, 2008

Season chronology
- ← Previous; Season 2

The third season of the VH1 reality television series Flavor of Love brings female contestants into the mansion of Flavor Flav to compete for his love. The third season premiered on February 11, 2008, featuring 25 contestants.

== Contestants ==
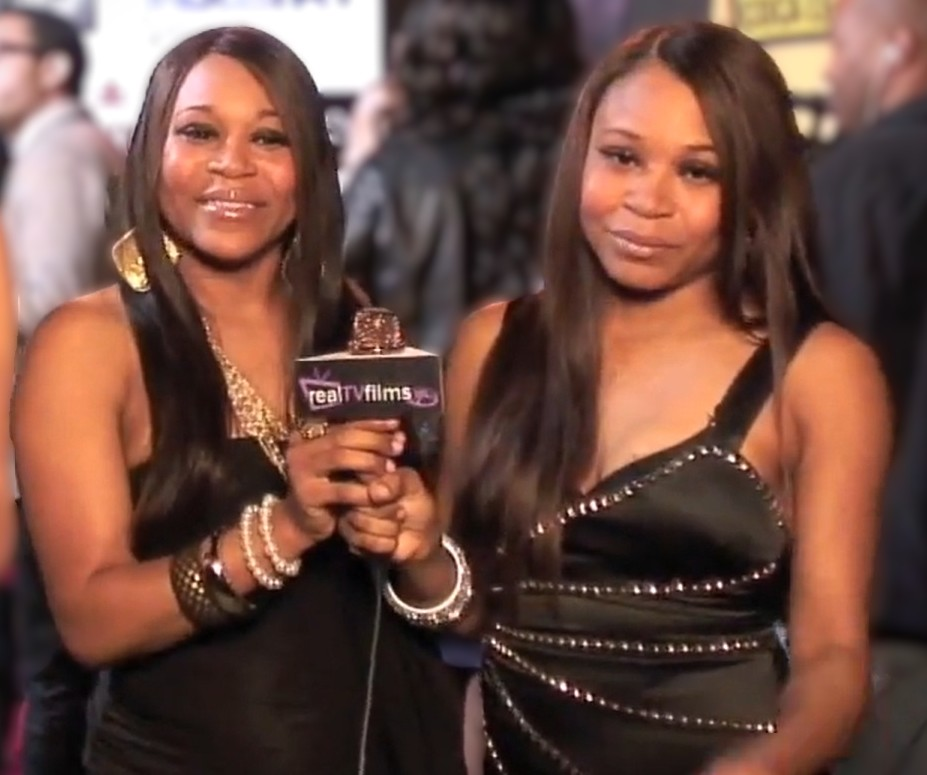
LaTrisha and LaTresha Hall, Thing 1 and Thing 2, in 2010. The latter won the contest.

Contestant	Real Name	Hometown	Finish	Place
Dymz	Esperanza Bloom	Atlanta, Georgia	Episode 1	25-21
Shore-Tee	Angela	Providence, Rhode Island	Episode 1	25-21
Savanna^{a}	Savanna Stidwell	Throggs Neck, New York	Episode 1	25-21
Peechee	Christa Hildenburg	Van Nuys, California	Episode 1	25-21
Q-Tee	Erika Louis	Katy, Texas	Episode 1	25-21
St. Lewis	Brittanie Skye	Downtown St. Louis, Missouri	Episode 2	20-18
Tik	Courtney Dee	Houston, Texas	Episode 2	20-18
El	Lisa	Atlanta, Georgia	Episode 2	20-18
Rayna	Earaina Mixon	St. Charles, Illinois	Episode 3	17-16
Ice	Amanda Habrowski	Saint Clair Shores, Michigan	Episode 3	17-16
Grayvee	Yvonne Govan †	Holcomb, Mississippi	Episode 4	15
Bee-Ex	T'wana Denard	Wappingers Falls, New York	Episode 5	14
Myammee	Angela Pitts	Riverdale, Georgia	Episode 6	13-12
Bunz	Courtney Lynn	Spring, Texas	Episode 6	13-12
Shy	MonaLisa Brown	Matteson, Illinois	Episode 7	11
Prancer	Mercedes Clausen	Dearborn, Michigan	Episode 8	10
Hotlanta	Nicole Essigman	Marietta, Georgia	Episode 9	9-8
Luscious D	Shannon Kulis	Bloomfield Hills, Michigan	Episode 9	9-8
Thing 1	LaTrisha Hall	Inglewood, California	Episode 10	7-6
Prototype	Maria Geiger	Naperville, Illinois	Episode 10	7-6
Tree	Rashida Shaw	Smyrna, Georgia	Episode 11	5
Seezinz	Autumn Joi	Cheltenham, Maryland	Episode 13	4
Sinceer	Nicole Featherston	Tucson, Arizona	Episode 15	3
Black	Candace Cabrera	Louisville, Kentucky	Episode 15	2
Thing 2	LaTresha Hall	Inglewood, California	Episode 15	1

^a Flav thought Savanna's real name was good enough to be her nickname as well, so her real name and nickname are the same.
^b Although Thing 2 was eliminated in Episode 12, she was brought back in Episode 13, and won the competition.

== Call-out order ==
Order	Episodes														
Order	1	2	3	4	5	6	7 (Note: At the end of the episode, Black, Luscious D, Prototype and Tree entered the competition.)	8 (Note: Thing 1 & Thing 2 competed individually for the remainder of the competition.)	9	10	11	12	13 (Note: Thing 2 re-entered the competition.)	15 (Note: Episode 14 was a recap episode.)	
1	Grayvee	Hotlanta	Thing 1 Thing 2	Prancer	Seezinz	Bunz	Seezinz	Black; Luscious D Prototype; Tree; Thing 2	Sinceer	Seezinz	Black	Seezinz	Seezinz	Thing 2	Thing 2
2	Rayna	Shy	Thing 1 Thing 2	Shy	Hotlanta	Thing 1 Thing 2	Thing 1 Thing 2	Black; Luscious D Prototype; Tree; Thing 2	Thing 1	Black	Thing 2	Black	Black	Black	Black
3	Bunz	Thing 1 Thing 2	Seezinz	Myammee	Myammee	Thing 1 Thing 2	Thing 1 Thing 2	Black; Luscious D Prototype; Tree; Thing 2	Thing 2	Sinceer	Seezinz	Sinceer	Sinceer	Sinceer	
4	Myammee	Thing 1 Thing 2	Prancer	Thing 1 Thing 2	Shy	Prancer	Sinceer	Black; Luscious D Prototype; Tree; Thing 2	Seezinz	Tree	Sinceer	Thing 2	Thing 2		
5	Prancer	Bunz	Grayvee	Thing 1 Thing 2	Thing 1 Thing 2	Sinceer	Prancer	Black; Luscious D Prototype; Tree; Thing 2	Black	Thing 2	Tree				
6	St. Lewis	Prancer	Bunz	Sinceer	Thing 1 Thing 2	Hotlanta	Hotlanta	Sinceer	Prototype	Thing 1 Prototype					
7	Hotlanta	Grayvee	Shy	Bunz	Prancer	Seezinz	Shy	Seezinz	Tree	Thing 1 Prototype					
8	Ice	Myammee	Bee-Ex	Seezinz	Sinceer	Myammee	Black; Luscious D Prototype; Tree	Thing 1	Hotlanta; Luscious D						
9	Tik	Bee-Ex	Hotlanta	Hotlanta	Bee-Ex	Shy	Black; Luscious D Prototype; Tree	Hotlanta	Hotlanta; Luscious D						
10	Sinceer	Ice	Sinceer	Bee-Ex	Bunz		Black; Luscious D Prototype; Tree	Prancer							
11	El	Seezinz	Myammee	Grayvee			Black; Luscious D Prototype; Tree								
12	Seezinz	Sinceer	Rayna; Ice												
13	Bee-Ex	Rayna	Rayna; Ice												
14	Shy	St. Lewis; Tik; El													
15	Thing 1 Thing 2	St. Lewis; Tik; El													
16	Thing 1 Thing 2	St. Lewis; Tik; El													
17	Dymz; Shore-Tee; Savanna; Peechee; Q-Tee														
18	Dymz; Shore-Tee; Savanna; Peechee; Q-Tee														
19	Dymz; Shore-Tee; Savanna; Peechee; Q-Tee														
20	Dymz; Shore-Tee; Savanna; Peechee; Q-Tee														
21	Dymz; Shore-Tee; Savanna; Peechee; Q-Tee														

The contestant received immunity
The contestant entered the competition
The contestant was eliminated

== Episodes ==
=== "In Flav We Trust" ===
First aired February 11, 2008 (2.8M viewers)

The show begins with 21 women waiting outside the mansion. Flavor Flav arrives in his limousine with Big Rick, he then talks to the ladies and tells them that this is the last time he will try to find love. Flav lets the women go inside the mansion and they trash the place by running, yelling, and breaking things as they try to find their beds.

Flavor Flav later calls the ladies down for their nicknames (he lets them chose their nicknames for the first time ever) and he is shocked to find twins on the show. He then holds a mixer to get to know the ladies better. At eliminations he calls out all the ladies to come get their clocks except Q-Tee, Shor-Tee, Peechee, Dymz, Savanna, and Things 1&2. He then calls down Thing 2 for the final clock and states that he can not separate them so he stretches the clock rope so they can both wear it. Q-Tee, Shore-Tee, Peechee, Dymz, and Savanna are eliminated. Flav also notices that four of the five ladies that were eliminated were online winners.

- Last Clock: Thing 1&2
- Eliminated: Q-Tee, Shor-Tee, Peechee, Dymz and Savanna

=== "Pimp My Gurney" ===
First aired February 18, 2008 (2.2M viewers)

With only 16 girls left, drama slowly arises. Rayna accused the girls of taking a bottle of her perfume, but she is later seen on the balcony talking to Tik, revealing that she did not really lose anything. This caused the other girls to believe that Rayna may only be in the house for camera time.

The challenge was the hospital challenge in which the girls had to impress Flavor Flav with their "nursing" skills. Some girls (such as Rayna and Tik) had weird presentations, and while other girls stood out amongst the rest to Flavor Flav; Ice had a creative presentation in which she asked Flav to throw darts at New York's face. Flavor Flav enjoyed Hotlanta the most because she got him a clock dedicated to one of his songs. The three girls were crowned challenge winners and participated in a group date with Flav. The date was a sky dive, and Hotlanta was initially scared, but she knew if she did not do it, she would not develop a connection with Flav. After the date, Ice told Flav that Rayna was one of the fakest girls in the house.

During the group date, the girls in the house were with motivational speaker, Sheryl Lee Ralph. She asked the girls to be nice to each other, and during that time, Shy and El revealed how they lost their parents. All of the girls seemed to be moved by that session, except for Sinceer, who chose to not pay any attention to Sheryl Lee Ralph nor get emotional because she only cared about Flav. Seemingly, they all played charades, in which they acted out each other. After someone impersonated how Sinceer drank a lot, she got mad and then did an impersonation of Seezinz, where she stood up with her arms on her hips and said she was a nobody. Word got up to Seezinz, and she went up to confront Sinceer, which ended up in them yelling at each other. Because of this, Seezinz suggested Flavor Flav that he should eliminate Sinceer, due to their earlier argument. Instead, Flav eliminated El, Tik, and St. Lewis. Flav felt El was not trying enough, he could not remember who St. Lewis was, and he felt that Tik was too crazy and strange for him to have a good connection.

- Challenge: Hospital Challenge
- Challenge winners: Ice, Myammee & Hotlanta
- Last clock: Rayna
- Eliminated: El, Tik & St. Lewis

=== "Reindeer Games" ===
First aired February 25, 2008

The 13 ladies wake up and Flav calls a meeting. Everyone comes down, but Flav notices Myammee is not there. This is because she took her time in order to look nice. He sends someone to get her and she eventually comes down. Flav challenges them to make a restaurant for him. Team A consists of Grayvee, Ice, Thing 1, Thing 2, Bunz, Sinceer, and Seezinz. Team B consists of Rayna, Myammee, Hotlanta, Shy, Bee-Ex, and Prancer. Each team is given $1,000 to spend on decorations. Both teams then picked names out of hats in order to decide who would be manager, and Grayvee was drawn for Team A, while Rayna was chosen for Team B.

Team A discusses the name and decides to name it after Flav's youngest son, Karma. Meanwhile, Ice & Grayvee (Team A) and Rayna & Shy (Team B) go to a fashion store to get some decorations. Shy sees a reindeer and realizes that they should take it, since she knows Flav loves reindeer. However, Rayna disagrees, saying that it is tacky and will not fit into the theme; She even says to the camera that she's the manager and nobody else's opinion counts. They do not take it, but the other team does. Shy says that she will knock Rayna out if they lose because of that.

After they finish, Flav brings a food critic over and they visit their first restaurant, Karma's. They are greeted by the twins and sit down. Bunz comes in to deliver the food she cooked: chicken wings and gumbo. The critic notices the giant reindeer and Flav tells him that he loves it. After they're finished, they go to the second restaurant. Flav and the critic do not like Rayna's style of high-class as it does not suit Flav. The menus come and Flav is disappointed at his name being spelled "Flava", when that is not the right spelling. He is also disappointed with Myammee and Hotlanta, who he had discussed this with and they still had gotten it wrong. The food comes and the critic worries that he might be risking his health if he eats it. Prancer tries to cheer the mood up by rolling out in her Heely's and bringing cheesecake which she mentions they got from the Cheesecake Factory.

After they're done, the food critic tells what he did and did not like from each teams food. From Team A, he said someone can not make chicken wings well and the gumbo was too salty. When Rayna heard this, she said (to the camera) she knew they had it in the bag. They also like Team A's theme (Mardi Gras). For Team B, the food critic did not like anything about their food and that it could be deadly. He also thought that the theme was not Flav; the theme was more of an upper class restaurant. Team A is voted the winner. Shy was furious with Rayna because Flav mentioned that he did like the reindeer.

Grayvee, the manager of Team A, goes on a solo date with Flav. They went to Flavs favorite and most "romantic" restaurant, Tony Romas. Grayvee makes a comment stating that she loves eating pigsfeet (with greens and cornbread) and Flav says he hates them and if he would've known she liked them, he would have named her that. The rest of the team later on goes ice-skating with Flav. Sinceer makes an insult about Bunz's mother, who has brain damage, and Flav is not happy with that. Meanwhile, back in the house, Prancer answers a phone call for Ice from her radio station. She hears Ice is here to gain popularity and that she's pretty much giving an interview on the house phone. Before elimination, Prancer goes to tell Flav that Ice is fake. He talks to Ice, who, says none of it is true. Shy then comes in the room and tells him that Rayna claims she only wants to make it to the Top 10. Rayna is brought into the room after that and she says is really here for him.

At elimination, before Sinceer is given her clock, she must apologize to Bunz. She does, but admits on camera that it was not genuine. There's one clock left and it comes down to Ice, Myammee, and Rayna. Flav calls Ice down and tells her that her time is up. Ice leaves and says to the camera she was just getting to know Flav as a person and she hopes to make her career bigger now. Flav calls down Myammee and Rayna and states that a man will be lucky to have either one of them. Flav then tells Rayna he is really feeling Myammee. Rayna leaves and questions why he kept "fivehead" (Sinceer), and the "DoubleMint Twins" (Thing 1 & Thing 2). Rayna says it's been real, and thus the last internet winner has been eliminated.

- Challenge: Restaurant Challenge
- Challenge winners: Team A

Team A: Grayvee, Ice, Thing 1 & Thing 2, Bunz, Sinceer, and Seezinz
Team B: Rayna, Myammee, Hotlanta, Shy, Bee-Ex, and Prancer

- Last clock: Myammee
- Eliminated: Rayna & Ice

=== "Things That Go Bump On The Lip" ===
First aired March 3, 2008

The contestants play in a "flavorette" roast. The first team consisted of Shy, Prancer, Sinceer, Thing 1 & 2, and Myammee. The second team consisted of Bunz, Hotlanta, Seezinz, Bee-Ex, and Grayvee. The first team had roasted Hotlanta. The second team roasted Shy. During the roast, it was revealed that Hotlanta had bump on her lip. Flav is apprehensive of bumps, since Beatuful from season two had a cold sore. Shy was roasted for her bad breath. The first team wins and Shy was the best roaster, so she got a solo date. During her solo date, Flav gave her a mint because of her bad breath. The rest of the team went on a group date. Flav also decided to bring Bee-Ex, because she was really good, even though her team did not win. Later on, a doctor checked Hotlanta, and she ended up having a pimple. This saved her from going home. At elimination, Grayvee was eliminated because Flav thought she was "too country", he did not like pig feet, and they did not have a good connection.

- Challenge: Flavorette Roast

Team 1: Shy, Prancer, Sinceer, Thing 1 & 2, and Myammee
Team 2: Bunz, Hotlanta, Seezinz, Bee-Ex, and Grayvee

- Challenge Winners: Team 1 (Shy)
- Last Clock: Bee-Ex
- Eliminated: Grayvee

=== "The Lyin', The Witch, & The Wardrobe Malfunction" ===
First aired March 10, 2008

Flav asks the ladies to read a bedtime story to some little kids. The first team up consists of Bee-Ex, Thing 1, Thing 2, and Prancer. Their story scores well with the kids, due to Thing 1&2 dressing as a horse, but Bee-Ex's slow narration irritates the team. The next team is Seezinz, Hotlanta, and Sinceer. The group decides the best strategy is to entice the kids. Seezinz give kids pots and pans to bang on during the story, and she engages one kid by having her free the mermaid (played by Hotlanta). The involvement was good, but the story was lacking according to the kids and Flav. The final team is Bunz, Myammee, and Shy. At the last moment, Bunz and Shy switch costumes. The costume ends up being too tight on Bunz, causing the audience to see her buttcheeks, and she was only wearing a thong. Even though they had a good story and they passed out candy, the incident with Bunz got them eliminated from the running. Flav declares the first team the winner.

At the dinner date, it goes over well with the winning team, although Thing 1 and Thing 2 complain about Bee-Ex during the date. Shy and Myammee harass Bunz about the loss and Bunz makes the story seem worse than it was when she talks to Flav about it. At the next elimination, he plans to eliminate two people, but he talks to Shy, Myammee, Bunz, and Bee-Ex first. Bunz admits to having exaggerated her story, which bothers Flav and lets Shy and Myammee off the hook. During her time with Flav, Bee-ex was given one last chance to say if there has been any other entertainment related work she has done. She declined the opportunity and elimination began. Bee-Ex and Bunz were the last two remaining with only one clock left.

He called down Bee-Ex and then pulls out a piece of paper which indicated that she had been on The Oprah Winfrey Show declaring to be Usher's biggest fan and there was also a picture of Usher and Bee-Ex together. Flav tells her that her time is up. Bee-Ex then says she does not have to prove herself to anybody and declares herself to be an Usher fan. She thanked Flav for allowing her on the show. Bunz gets her clock and Flav warns the girls that if they give him false information, he will eliminate them.

- Challenge: Reading Bedtime Stories to Children
- Challenge winners: Team 1

Team 1: Bee-Ex, Thing 1, Thing 2, and Prancer
Team 2: Seezinz, Hotlanta, and Sinceer
Team 3: Bunz, Myammee & Shy

- Last clock: Bunz
- Eliminated: Bee-Ex

=== "Dial 'M' for Mystery Pimp Caller" ===
First aired March 17, 2008

During this episode, Flav has the ladies compete against one another in a competition to see which girl has the "total package." Thing 1&2 beat Hotlanta in class. Myammee beat Bunz in hotness. Prancer beat Seezinz in mothering. Myammee beat Thing 1&2 in Spirituality. Shy beat Sinceer in luck. Prancer beat Shy in smarts. In the final competition Prancer and Myammee faced of having to rescue a Flav dummy from the pool and put it on a medical cot. Prancer easily won once Myammee stopped because of her hair getting wet. Prancer and Flav went on a date body painting. Rayna called earlier and told Seezinz that she had a trick up her sleeve. Meanwhile, at the house Shy received a phone call from a man telling her Myammee owed him $1,000. He threatened to get to her and the other girls at the mansion if she did not pay up. When Flav got back with Prancer he found Shy and Myammee in a fight over the phone call. He pulled Shy aside and found out that she was so upset because recently her cousin stole some money and it cost her her life. Flav was touched by the story but found it hard to focus because of Shy's bad breath. Flav then sat down with Thing 1&2 and Sinceer who told him during the competition Bunz mentioned that she would rather be with her sons than there playing a game. Sinceer was upset that she considered Flavor of Love 3 a game. When Flav talked to Bunz she admitted to saying that but meant the total package competition not Flavor of Love 3. Flav later finally talked to Myammee. Flav gave Myammee her clock that night in his room where she told him everything. However she did not mention anything about the man on the phone. Flav feeling Myammee was holding back asked for her clock back. At elimination before giving out clocks he called up Bunz and told her he would not want her here worrying about her sons so he eliminated her. Bunz said she was happy that she went out like that. Flav then gave a clock to Thing 1&2, Prancer, Sinceer, Hotlanta, and Seezinz. With just Myammee and Shy left, Flav called down Myammee. He told her he did not feel she was being completely honest and was eliminated. Myammee said she had no idea who had called. Seezinz said she knew Rayna had problems with some of the girls but did not know if maybe she posed as the man. Finally, Shy was called down to get her clock. Flav said she would've been called earlier but he can not avoid her horrible breath and she needs to fix it.

- Challenge: Total Package
- Challenge winner: Prancer
- Last clock: Shy
- Eliminated: Bunz, Myammee

=== "Halitosis Ohmyosis" ===
First aired March 24, 2008

In episode 7, the remaining girls gather into the great hall. Flav introduces his challenge - having the girls put together a Flavor of Love calendar to show off their business skills - and that Saaphyri and Buckwild would be helping to judge, because Saaphyri is an entrepreneur and has her own line of lip balm called Lip Chap. While picking the months, the girls yell and scream at Prancer for wanting to be in most of the shots. Prancer finds cover by making fun of Shy. When the challenge is over, Saaphyri and Buckwild picked Prancer and Seezinz as the winners. Flav took the girls to an Aerial Arts Building. While Prancer and Seezinz go on their date with Flav, Shy went to the dentist, who revealed she had a diet of mostly candy, and that she needs a lot of expensive dental work. At elimination time, the girls are called down one by one to receive their clocks; Shy was eliminated. Flav was not feeling Shy because her breath always smelled horrible, and she never brushed her teeth. Saaphyri brought four new girls into the competition, which upset the remaining girls.

- Challenge: Flavor of Love Calendar
- Judges/guests: Saaphyri, Buckwild
- Challenge winners: Prancer, Seezinz
- Last clock: Hotlanta
- Eliminated: Shy
- New contestants: Black, Prototype, Luscious D, Tree

=== "A Night at the Hip-Hopera" ===
First aired March 31, 2008

Episode 8 begins right where episode 7 left off. Saaphyri and Buckwild have brought four girls in the house because they really want Flav to find love. The new girls then introduce themselves to Flav. The first girl up is named Candace and wants to be called Blue because of her eyes, but Flav names her Black because of the color of her clothes. The next girl is named Mariah and wants to be called Prototype. The third girl up wants to be called Luscious D because she considers herself luscious and because of her D-Sized breast. Flav lets her keep that name. The final girl up was very tall and wanted to be called Legz because of her height. Flav then said that his nephew's name is Legz so he decides to call her Tree. He says she is a tree he would love to de-bark. Sinceer and the other girls decide to go upstairs and mess up the room where the new girls will stay. Sinceer then argues with Black.

The next morning, Flav tells the girls to put on a hip-hopera. Seezinz is the director, Prancer is Flav Pt. 1, Sinceer is Flav Pt. 2, Hotlanta is Toastee and Pumkin, Luscious D is Brigitte Nielsen, Thing 1 & 2 are the narrators, Prototype is Deelishis and Big Rick, Black is Hoopz & Tree is New York. After the hip-hopera, Flav gives the best performance trophy to Prototype and 2nd best performance to Sinceer; therefore, they win a date with him. Before the date, Flav asks the new girls to decide which of the old girls should have the immunity clock. They interview every girl and end up picking Thing 2, which means that Thing 1 and Thing 2 will no longer share a clock. Flav later awards all of the new girls with their clocks. At the elimination ceremony, Flav is left with Hotlanta and Prancer as the final two. Flav then tells Hotlanta that if she can convince him to keep her and not Prancer then she can stay. She ends up doing so, and Prancer is eliminated.

- Challenge: Hip-Hopera
- Challenge winners: Prototype, Sinceer
- Immuinity: Black, Prototype, Luscious D, Tree, Thing 2
- Last clock: ~~Prancer~~ (Hotlanta)
- Eliminated: Prancer

=== "'Til Death Do Us Part" ===
First aired April 7, 2008

Flav prepares a Wedding and Funeral Challenge for the nine remaining ladies and they all have to form into teams of three. Thing 1, Thing 2 and Sinceer were team 1, Hotlanta, Tree and Seezinz were team 2, and Prototype, Black and Luscious D were team 3. During the wedding challenge, Thing 1 said Flav's real name wrong, even though they won the challenge. Hotlanta was upset that Flav did not stand up for her when Sinceer objected to her marriage with Flav like he did the other girls. During the funeral challenge Sinceer cried, making her the winner due to her wedding and funeral speech and her date was to go in an airplane with Flav. Flav pressed the emergency fuel shutoff while kissing and the plane started to fall. Luckily, he pulled the lever in time to save himself and Sinceer. While they were on the date, Tree, Black and Luscious D spoke with Hotlanta and Hotlanta insinuated that Flav was broke and that the mansion was not his and that she was "going off" tonight. Later on that night when Flav spends one-on-one time with the ladies, Tree requested Hotlanta attend her one on one time with Flav where she told Flav in front of Hotlanta about what she said. Hotlanta tries to defend herself claiming that they took what she said out of context. Thing 1 then calls Hotlanta a "money hungry bitch." Thing 1 states, "You want Stability and you're not gonna get it here." At elimination, Flav sends home Luscious D because she was a nice girl but he felt like they did not have a strong enough connection. He had a clock for Hotlanta and gave it to her but then said, "Your time is up." Hotlanta agrees to leave, but says "I said that if I left I wouldn't regret anything. But the only thing I regret is trusting you. In Flav, Hotlanta does not trust". Hotlanta cries during her exit interview.

- Challenge: Wedding and Funeral Challenge

Team 1: Thing 1, Thing 2, Sinceer
Team 2: Hotlanta, Tree, Seezinz
Team 3: Prototype, Black, Luscious D

- Challenge winners: Team 1/Sinceer
- Last clock: Hotlanta
- Eliminated: Luscious D, Hotlanta

=== "'The Neverwed Game" ===
First aired April 14, 2008

At the beginning of the show, Seezinz decides to make breakfast for Flav and tells him that she does not want to participate in today's challenge, which also meant that she would not go on a solo date with Flav. She then states that the reason she did that is because she does not want Flav to think that "she just wants to win". Flav then accepts and Seezinz leaves. Then, the girls get themselves ready for today's challenge, "The Neverwed Game", which is a game that the Flavorettes' answers have to match their ex-boyfriend's when a question is being called. The first round had Thing 1, Tree and Prototype with their ex-boyfriends. While the questions were being called, Thing 1's ex-boyfriend had stated that Thing 1 had oral sex with her boyfriend one month ago before she went on the show. Thing 1 states that it was a lie and her ex was lying which he was. Prototype's ex-boyfriend stated that they broke up because she was jealous and her ex had so many girlfriends. Tree and her ex were answering the questions perfectly, so she had the highest score. Round 2 then started and included Thing 2, Black and Sinceer. Thing 2 stated that she and her boyfriend broke up because he was not being faithful. Then, her ex stated that she wanted to be on the show because of exposure. Then, Black's ex had said that she was a stalker, crazy, and a psycho and wanted to be on the show to be famous, which frightened Flav. Sinceer's boyfriend thought that she was a bit of a diva and loved Flav. After the questions were being called, Flav obviously picked Tree because she had the most answers right and had a solo date with Flav, wearing an exposing black outfit. Then after their date, everyone, (including Seezinz) and her ex were at the mixer in Flav's backyard. Prototype brought Flav to the side and told him her feelings about being with someone who takes part in drinking and smoking, and said she didn't want to. Confusion started when Seezinz wanted to get dirt on Thing 1 by talking to her ex, which caused a riot. Thing 1 starts getting in Seezinz face. Then, Seezinz backed up & put her hand in Thing 1s face, Thing 1 screams to not touch her man & grabs her hand then pushes her. Later, Seezinz was kicked out of her room. Right before eliminations started, Seezinz wanted to make an apology to the twins, but the twins did not accept that. But Flav saw that she was true to her feelings. Black and Sinceer received their clocks next. Then, Flav asked Tree if she is still into her ex. Tree responded with a no and got her clock. Flav addressed Prototype about the conversation from earlier about drinking and smoking, and said he wasn't ready to change his ways, and eliminated her. Then it was down to the twins. Flav said that it was the toughest decision he ever made, so he then picked Thing 2 to stay, and said goodbye to Thing 1. Sinceer said that her new goal is to get every person who does not belong there out of the house until she's the last woman standing.

- Challenge: The Neverwed Game
- Challenge winner: Tree
- Last clock: Thing 2
- Eliminated: Thing 1, Prototype

=== "'When Flavorettes Attack" ===
First aired April 21, 2008

In this episode, Flav takes the girls to the Power 106 station for an appearance on Big Boy's Neighborhood. Flav is interviewed first and then leaves the girls to be interviewed. The girls do not know that Flav was listening to the entire radio show. The girls began to swear on the show until ultimately, they were kicked off of the air. They were eventually allowed back on and the callers thought that Seezinz was the best choice for Flav. People began to call in with reaction to the fight insinuated by Sinceer and Thing 2 against Seezinz earlier on the air. An overwhelming amount of callers sided with Seezinz. Black made her presence known on the radio without getting caught up in the drama. Tree became reserved during the radio show. The radio hosts awarded the two dates to Black because of her composure and Seezinz due to her winning over the callers. Tree was eliminated.

- Challenge: Radio Interview
- Challenge winners: Black, Seezinz
- Last clock: Sinceer
- Eliminated: Tree

=== "'It's a Family Flav-Fair" ===
First aired April 28, 2008

All their girls call their parents to come out and meet Flav, except for Black's parents. Thing 2's parents and Sinceer's parents go bowling with their daughters and Flav. Flav says that he's really feeling both girls, but Thing 2's family does not approve of Flav dating many women at once. Black, Seezinz, Seezinz's parents, and Flav go on a miniature golf date. Black takes a dominant role in the date, while Seezinz holds back around her parents. Seezinz's parents slowly gain respect for Flav and once they see he is a nice guy inside, they approve of Seezinz being with him. While this is going on, Sinceer overhears Thing 2 talking to her mom. Her mom tells her that she is worried Thing 2 can not stand on her own without Thing 1. Sinceer feels that Thing 2 needs someone to cling onto and, seeing Thing 2 as her biggest threat, tells Flav about this. After that drama, Flav's mom joins the party and all the contestants, Flav, and all of the parents sit down for dinner. Sinceer's drunk dad makes very rude remarks, especially to Black about her being white. Flav's mom approves all four women for him and leaves eliminations up to him. In a dramatic elimination, Flav decides to send home Thing 2. This leaves both her and Flav in tears and Thing 2 in disbelief. When Thing 2 said the words, "Why Flav. Why? Why?" It made Flav really think about what he did.

- Last Clock: Sinceer
- Eliminated: Thing 2

=== "Von Boyage" ===
First aired May 5, 2008 (2.2M viewers)

At the beginning of this episode Seezinz and Sinceer get into it. Seezinz tells Sinceer, that getting your only friend eliminated was a messed up thing to do and as usual Black takes no sides. Flav brings the final three girls, Sinceer, Seezinz and Black to Cannes, France. It is beautiful, but the arguing covers it up. All the girls seem to have negative feelings about the other girls. They dislike them, and they want them out. Thus, they use their time to try to get one another eliminated. First, Sinceer accused Black of being a psycho and as Black's date goes on, Flav gets flashbacks proving that Black reminded him of New York from last season. This kind of got Flav's attention and not in a good way. Although, Flav seemed to be liking Seezinz, this perception changed once Black told Flav what Seezinz told her, which was, she was tired of the drama, that she knew she was going home and was basically here for the competition more than Flav. Furthermore, Black then tells Flav about Seezinz stating that she believes that she is only being "kept there for drama" after Seezinz left from her date. Soon thereafter, Black and Flav confront Seezinz. Flav asks Seezinz the question "Do you think you are here for drama?" she replies "somewhat", which upsets Flav. After the answer to the question, Seezinz and Black go back to their room and Seezinz ignores Black for "callin' her out" in front of Flav.

Due to the fussing and fighting a frustrated Flav relies on which two he can trust the most, Seezinz is the one eliminated. Flav feels that the connection is there but Black and Sinceer might be there more for the right reasons. Also, he stated that her answer to his question, "really hurt." Flav continues, and he brings back Thing 2. Flav starts once again and says that the rest of the activities are only for two girls, and that the next morning one of the three girls would be eliminated.

- Eliminated: Seezinz
- Re-Entered: Thing 2

=== "Clip Show" ===
First aired May 12, 2008

Episode 14 is a clip show with never before seen footage.

=== "Parlez-Vous Flavor?" ===
First aired May 19, 2008 (2.92M viewers)

The next morning Flav, Sinceer, Thing 2, and Black have breakfast. Flav stated earlier on Episode 13 that somebody would have to go home the next morning. During breakfast, Flav pulls out 3 flight tickets. One ticket is to Paris, another one is to Monaco, and the last one is to Los Angeles. First, Flav gives the ticket to Paris. The ticket went to Thing 2. Next, Sinceer and Black start fighting because they were debating why each other should go home. After the fight, Flav gives Black the ticket to Monaco, and Sinceer is sent home back to Los Angeles. Flav goes on the plane with Black to Monaco first. Then, Thing 2 gets her date with Flav in Paris. After the 2 dates were over, Flav had to make his decision. Flav chose Thing 2 over Black; And Thing 2 is his "queen."

- Final 3: Black, Sinceer, Thing 2
- Eliminated: Sinceer
- Thing 2's Date Location: Paris
- Black's Date Location: Monaco
- Eliminated: Black
- Winner: Thing 2

=== "Reunion: After The Lovin'" ===
First aired May 26, 2008

On the reunion episode, Flav and 20 girls (5 girls did not show up) talk about what happened on the show and what is going on in the lives right now. The first to be brought out to speak on the show was Sommore, who felt the show was a bad alternative to meet a man. She said that Flav was not attractive enough to tell someone their breath stinks (referring to Shy being eliminated due to Flav telling her she had bad breath). The first contestant from the show to be brought on the stage by Sommore was Ice. Ice explains that she was only on the show to get where she needed to be and she admitted to Flav that them as a couple would never happen. Flav replied back, "That's why I did not pick you." Next to be brought to the stage was Shy, who was upset at how she was portrayed on Flavor of Love. She felt like teenage girls saw her as a role model for the wrong reasons and she could not find work in the entertainment industry because she's known for having bad breath. She and Prancer then talk about the disease their mothers had/have and Flav respects their modesty. Next up were Hotlanta and Sinceer who talk about their constant drinking on the show and how they felt about being on the show. Sinceer gets into an argument with Seezinz which almost turns into violence. Afterwards, Black comes up and explains that her and Flav had a lot of kindling off-camera and that she is very shy and takes a long time to open up her feelings and she wished she had done so. Finally, Thing 2 comes on the show, and Flav breaks up with her when he proposes on stage to Liz, his youngest son Karma's mother. In an end credits scene, Shy performs a song.

Contestants Who Did Attend: Tik, El, St. Lewis, Ice, Rayna, Gravyee, Bee-Ex, Bunz, Myammee, Shy, Prancer, Luscious D, Hotlanta, Prototype, Thing 1, Thing 2, Tree, Seezinz, Sinceer, Black

Contestants Who Did Not Attend: Savanna, Shore-Tee, Dymz, Peechee, Q-Tee

== After the show ==
- Prancer (Mercedes Clausen), Myammee (Angela Pitts), and Ice (Amanda Habrowski) were selected to compete in the second season of I Love Money, in which Ice came in seventh place, Prancer fourth, and Myammee eventually won.
- Myammee was featured in the music video for "Mrs. International" by Method Man & Redman.
- Rayna, also known as Earaina Mixon, started a nonprofit called "Rayna's RainDrops" which helps kids with multiple sclerosis develop social and emotional skills.
- In 2020, a couple of girls from Season 3 stated that Flavor Flav only did season 3 for money and also that Flav's fiancee Elizabeth "Liz" Trujillo stayed in the house as well during filming of season three.
- Grayvee (Yvonne Govan) passed away on March 30, 2026.

== DVD release ==
The DVD was released on June 3, 2008 along with the I Love New York Season 2 DVD. It features 15 episodes, the casting special, featurettes, a supertrailer, and a code inside to see the reunion.

== See also ==
- List of Flavor of Love contestants
