= Flavor of Love Girls: Charm School =

- Season 1
- Cast of Flavor of Love Girls: Charm School (left to right): Top: Darra, Thela, Shay, Saaphyri, Courtney, Becky, Schatar Bottom: Jennifer, Larissa, Heather, Leilene, Cristal, Brooke
- Starring: Mo'Nique; Keith Lewis; Mikki Taylor
- Presented by: Mo'Nique
- No. of contestants: 13
- Winner: Saaphyri Windsor
- No. of episodes: 11

Release
- Original network: VH1
- Original release: April 15 – July 8, 2007

Season chronology
- Next → Rock of Love: Charm School

Flavor of Love Girls: Charm School is the first season of the VH1 reality show Charm School. It is a spin-off of Flavor of Love created by the producers of The Surreal Life and Flavor of Love spin-off I Love New York. It is hosted by comedian actress Mo'Nique, assisted by talent agency president Keith Lewis and magazine beauty director Mikki Taylor, and features thirteen contestants from the first two seasons of Flavor of Love, assigned the challenge of developing proper etiquette in a competition for $50,000 and the title of "Charm School Queen." The show was recorded over 25 days in an Encino mansion during Fall 2006. Saaphyri Windsor was ultimately named Charm School Queen and was awarded the $50,000.

== Ten Commandments ==
1. Check Thyself Before Thou Wreck Thyself
2. Thou Shalt Goeth, Girl
3. Thou Shalt Show Some Class
4. Thou Shalt Work What Thou Art Working With
5. Thou Shalt Spit Mad Game With Style
6. Thou Shalt Mind Thy Money
7. Thou Shalt Payeth It Back
8. Thou Shalt Represent
9. Unless Thou Can Play, Thou Wilt Be Played
10. Thou Shalt Be Fully Fabulous

== Contestants ==
Cast member	Original season	Finish	Place
Saaphyri Windsor	Flavor of Love 2	Episode 10	1
Leilene "Smiley" Ondrade	Flavor of Love	Episode 10	2
Becky "Buckwild" Johnston	Flavor of Love 2	Episode 10	3
Shay "Buckeey" Johnson	Flavor of Love 2	Episode 10	4
Brooke "Pumkin" Thompson	Flavor of Love	Episode 8	5
Larissa "Bootz" Hodge	Flavor of Love 2	Episode 7	6
Darra "Like Dat" Boyd	Flavor of Love 2	Episode 6	7-8
Schatar "Hottie" Taylor	Flavor of Love	Episode 6	7-8
Courtney "Goldie" Jackson	Flavor of Love	Episode 5	9
Cristal "Serious" Steverson	Flavor of Love	Episode 4	10
Jennifer "Toasteee" Toof	Flavor of Love 2	Episode 3	11
Heather "Krazy" Crawford	Flavor of Love 2	Episode 2	12
Thela "Rain" Brown	Flavor of Love	Episode 1	13

== Episode Progress ==
#	Contestants	Episodes										
#	Contestants	1	2	3	4	5	6	7	8	10		
1	Saaphyri	WIN	SAFE	WIN	BTM 2	SAFE	SAFE	WIN	BTM 3	SAFE	WIN	WINNER
2	Leilene	BTM 3	SAFE	WIN	BTM 3	WIN	WIN	SAFE	BTM 2	SAFE	BTM 2	RUNNER UP
3	Becky	WIN	SAFE	BTM 3	SAFE	SAFE	SAFE	BTM 2	WIN	SAFE	ELIM	
4	Shay	WIN	SAFE	WIN	SAFE	BTM 3	BTM 4	BTM 3	SAFE	ELIM	JDGE	
5	Brooke	SAFE	SAFE	SAFE	WIN	WIN	WIN	SAFE	ELIM			
6	Larissa	WIN	BTM 3	WIN	WIN	BTM 2	BTM 4	ELIM				
7	Schatar	WIN	WIN	WIN	WIN	SAFE	ELIM					
8	Darra	BTM 3	SAFE	SAFE	SAFE	WIN	ELIM					
9	Courtney	WIN	SAFE	SAFE	WIN	ELIM						
10	Cristal	SAFE	BTM 3	BTM 2	ELIM							
11	Jennifer	WIN	SAFE	ELIM								
12	Heather	SAFE	ELIM									
13	Thela	ELIM										

The contestant won the show.
The contestant won the challenge and was immune from expulsion.
The contestant sat out of the challenge, but was immune from expulsion.
The contestant did not win the challenge but was safe from expulsion.
The contestant was at risk for expulsion.
The contestant was expelled.
The contestant was the judge of the challenge.
The contestant was the runner-up of the show.

== Episodes ==
=== No Mo'Nicknames ===
First aired April 15, 2007

Each girl was introduced and the audience was told why they were chosen to go to Charm School, via clips from Flavor of Love. From the first season, Smiley returned due to her emotional outburst on the night of her elimination; Serious for her egomania during a confrontation she, New York, and the other girls had with Hottie; Goldie for drinking, passing out and vomiting her first night in the house; Pumkin for spitting on New York during her elimination; Rain for engaging in a screaming match with New York and Hottie for her "adorable" behavior, which, amongst other things, led her to present raw chicken to Flavor Flav and his mother. From the second season, Saaphyri returned for assaulting H-Town over a bed, resulting in her subsequent disqualification an hour into the competition; Bootz for "hating" on other contestants; Buckwild for being the blackest white girl, Like Dat for her slovenly table manners; Buckeey and Krazy for their balcony fight which led to Buckeey's elimination; and Toasteee due to her revelation that she posed nude for pornographic websites and production companies.

The headmistress of this season ended up being Mo'Nique. As they entered the house, two people were introduced to assist Mo'Nique in eliminations: Mikki, an Essence magazine editor, and Keith, from an entertainment agency and beauty pageant coordinator. All the girls received their pledge pins from Mo'Nique and threw out their name tags with their nicknames from when they were on Flavor of Love. Saaphyri was the only contestant on Charm School without a nickname, due to her disqualification for assaulting another contestant (H-Town) before she received one on Flavor of Love 2. From this point forward, each contestant was referred to using their real names. A mixer was then held for the girls to have talks with Mo'Nique and the deans.

For their first challenge, the girls went on a sisterhood retreat, having to take a two-mile hike to their campsite from the bus with each of them lugging items for the camp. Thela immediately blew a fuse, saying she has an "Achilles heel" and can't hike two miles in the woods. She ended up doing it, although complaining the entire way. Schatar was the first to reach the campsite, but came with only one log and a bag of candy while the rest of the group reach the campsite later with the rest of the items. At camp, the girls struggled with setting the tent and preparing food. Thela starts to lose patience as no one helps her find a can opener, and she has a minor breakdown. Leilene tries to comfort her, although fearing she would look weak as well.

Mikki appeared at the campsite later that night to instruct the girls to nominate two captains for each team for the next day’s challenge: Saaphyri was nominated, and Leilene stepped up to be a captain. Early in the morning, the girls received a wake-up call from a Drill Sergeant (Franklin Dennis Jones) who took them to a marine boot camp obstacle course. Becky remarks that she would date him and that he was cute (at least to her). Darra immediately gripes, as she is not very athletic. Keith and the Drill Sergeant appeared as well, showing the girls the course will teach them the value of teamwork, and afterwards, a member of the losing team was expelled.

Despite being instructed to choose the teammates that would help the team to win, Leilene picked Thela (who was complaining about her leg) and Darra (who is not athletic), so their feelings wouldn't be hurt. She showed her weakness as a captain and it continued to show when she tried to motivate them, and did not have a strategy.

Saaphyri's team won the challenge, as Darra could not get over the rope wall in the obstacle course and had to be pulled down by her teammates, costing the challenge for the team. Before the elimination, Thela went to Mo'Nique's office to have a one-on-one with her. This meeting is damaging to Thela because she says that when she gets angry, she "cannot see". She also admits to getting high and Mo'Nique believed that she was high during the interview. Larissa remarks that if Thela could get a one-on-one with Mo'Nique, it was unfair that everyone can't have one.

At the elimination, Leilene and Darra were called out for their weakness, but Thela was ultimately eliminated. Mo'Nique mentioned that Thela could have been a potential hazard to herself and the rest of the girls, and it was best if she was expelled.

- Challenge Winner(s): Saaphyri, Becky, Courtney, Jennifer, Larissa, Schatar, Shay
- Bottom 3: Darra, Leilene, Thela
- Expelled: Thela

Reasons For Elimination

- Thela - Mo'Nique felt that Thela's anger was a very serious issue, and that what she needed was more drastic than what the show could've done for her.

=== Dirty Drawers Done Dirt Cheap ===
First aired April 22, 2007

Guest instructor Colette Swann was brought in to help teach the girls about manners, hence "Thou Shalt Show Some Class". Heather came down with red pumps, leading to even the teacher to comment them as "stripperish". Most of the girls struggled walking normally, let alone with a book on their head. Cristal was able to do this well, although she grumbles about her hair being ruined. When the girls get to table manners, Leilene gets confused. After asking too many questions, Leilene gets herself into doing a toast in front of everyone. Although Leilene is intimidated, she pulls it off very well.

Mo'Nique then gave them their challenge; Andrew Firestone from The Bachelor would arrive and had to pick the girl that impressed him the most. They would pair into twos for the first round. Then the best of the duo would go to dinner with him. Firestone would then select two of the six, and choose the winner after dessert with the final pair. The winner would help represent Firestone at an event and be safe. Schatar and Heather immediately pair up, in which Schatar then reveals to Heather that she had hidden Heather's dress. Larissa and Shay want Brooke as their partner, as both thought they would win against her easily, but Brooke choose Larissa.

The girls first had to talk to Firestone in groups of two to see who will impress him enough to go onto the dinner. During her interview, Larissa flirts with Firestone, saying she wanted to get to know him better and gets chosen for the dinner. He chose Becky for the dinner when she claimed to be a wine expert. Jennifer told Firestone she doesn't like wine "at all" in an effort to ditch her image from Flavor of Love. She was rejected for the dinner. Courtney was rejected when she asked Firestone if he came from California and did reality TV. He retorted, "I thought I was supposed to be asking the questions".

At the dinner, Cristal talked at length about herself, Larissa barely talked, and Darra acted politely. When Schatar mentioned donating to charity, Darra said that was not a subject one should boast about. When asked to describe herself, Becky said that she is funny. She came up with a rhyme: "They call me Miss No Booty. When I turn around I got no back to me".

Firestone picked Darra and Schatar for dessert. Firestone ultimately picked Schatar over Darra. Brooke decided to get even, mainly for Schatar stealing Heather's dress, by putting a pair of underwear up on her picture. When Shay, Larissa, and Brooke point out Schatar's underwear on her picture, Schatar denies they're hers. Schatar went to Firestone's event, in which she had to be a spokesmodel.

The rest of the class had to pair up and make Mo'Nique a meal from her cookbook, "Skinny Cooks Can't be Trusted". Leilene had an anxiety attack because she cannot cook and arrives to the kitchen late. Saaphyri commented on how Leilene has three children but cannot cook. No one let her help since they were almost finished, so she was left to make grilled cheese sandwiches by herself. Mo'Nique had lunch and tried the girls' food. The girls told on Leilene because she was not in the kitchen on time to do her part and she made something that was not in the book. Leilene got upset but tried not to cry so she would not look emotional. Mo'Nique made a point of asking for the grilled cheese sandwiches, which she sampled first.

The girls had to role-play each other. Brooke was made fun of for freaking out about the dresses, and everyone laughed. When Jennifer role-played Shay, everyone laughed as well. When Saaphyri was told to role-play Cristal, she made fun of how Cristal talks too much. Cristal role-played Saaphyri by screaming. Mo'Nique commented on how the girls were fighting and the lunch was not even a competition.

Elimination was between Larissa, Cristal, and Heather. Mo'Nique reasoned that Larissa acted childish, Cristal was self-absorbed, and Heather possessed a diva and self-centered attitude. Heather was ultimately expelled. Larissa commented afterward that it sent the wrong message for Schatar not to be punished for her actions, noting that she might do the same thing to Schatar, "or anyone else, to get ahead."

- Challenge Winner(s): Schatar
- Bottom 3: Cristal, Heather, Larissa
- Expelled: Heather

Reasons For Elimination

- Heather - Mo'Nique felt that Heather had a poor attitude and played the "victim" role far too often.

=== Big Titty Girl No-No ===
First aired April 29, 2007

The eleven remaining girls learned about high fashion when they had to split into two teams and put on a fashion show. There were two teams of five (two dress designers, hair stylist, make-up artist, and model), leaving one girl left over as a judge to be exempt. The girls chose Courtney to be the judge, and then made the teams. The first team consisted of Larissa, Leilene, Saaphyri, Schatar, and Shay. The second team consisted of Becky, Brooke, Cristal, Darra, and Jennifer. On the first team, Leilene was chosen as the model, Saaphyri was chosen for make-up, Larissa was chosen for hair and Schatar and Shay were the dress designers. On the second team, Darra was chosen as the model, Cristal was chosen for make-up, Brooke was chosen for hair and Becky and Jennifer were the dress designers. Even though Cristal was a model outside of the show, she believed that being the model would irritate the judges for being in the limelight. Jennifer did hardly anything, leaving the design to Becky and Cristal, who took control and planned much of the outfit. Meanwhile, the girls on the first team spied on the second team. At the competition, the judges praised Leilene's team, who ended up making a wonderful outfit with a fierce presentation. On the other hand, Darra's team was chastised after the dress ended up looking horrible, and they were accused of trying to manipulate Mo'Nique, as choosing the larger woman to model would appeal to her more. While Brooke's team was banking on her friend with Courtney to save them from expulsion, Courtney ultimately chose Leilene's team. Before the elimination, Cristal talked to Mo'Nique and put the blame on Becky and Jennifer, since they were in charge of designing the dress. At the elimination, Becky, Cristal, and Jennifer were the bottom three. Keith told Cristal that it was the one time she could have been the model, so it was foolish for her to not choose to be. Mo'Nique sent Becky back with the other girls, leaving either Cristal or Jennifer to be eliminated. She gave the two girls a chance to explain themselves, and Jennifer began to talk about herself instead of why Cristal should go home, thus making it easier for Mo'Nique to expel Jennifer.

- Challenge Winner(s): Larissa, Leilene, Schatar, Saaphyri, Shay
- Bottom 3: Becky, Cristal, Jennifer
- Expelled: Jennifer

Reasons For Elimination

- Jennifer - Mo'Nique felt that Jennifer didn't put much effort into the challenge and into Charm School overall. While Cristal arguably drove the team to failure by not stepping up as the model and had the most input in the dress design, she compellingly explained to Mo'Nique that her hard work meant more than Jennifer's lack thereof, thus sealing Jennifer's fate.

(Note: For censorship reasons, this episode on iTunes is called "Big Booby Girl No-No")

=== Master Debaters ===
First aired May 6, 2007

The girls were sent to California State University, Fullerton, to learn how to debate. They were split into two teams of five, Team 1 consisted of Brooke, Courtney, Larrisa, Leilene, and Schatar and Team 2 consisted of Becky, Cristal, Darra, Saaphyri, and Shay. After learning the basics of debate each team had to choose the four girls who would participate in the debate and one who would be "benched". The benched girls would not be safe from expulsion whether or not their respective team won the debate. During the debate Brooke and Becky opened with Becky and Team 2 arguing that the girls on Courtney's team should be expelled and Brooke's team arguing the opposite. In the second round Larissa was to ask the questions and Shay is to rebut. Larissa stumbled over her part and Mo'Nique was impressed with Shay's debating skills. The third part put Schatar and Saaphyri against each other. Saaphyri kept interrupting Schatar's answering of the questions. Darra and Courtney were set up to close the arguments. Dr. Jon Bruschke made the decision that the negative team 'focused on the task' and awarded them the trophy and the victory. Mo'Nique did not believe they deserved to win so she tells them how she, Mikki, and Keith really felt. Mo'Nique did not believe that the negative team did their job. Larissa calls her a hater. She said that it is not fair because whenever she loses, she gets an attitude and now that she didn't have an attitude, Mo'Nique still did not like her. Mo'Nique told Larissa that she needs to grow up and walked off camera claiming, "Now you done pissed me off." Afterwards, the girls went to a bar and got very drunk. They posed and took pictures with the guys as well as danced and made out with them. Leilene asked if the whole world talks about Larissa if she will fight the whole world. Larissa then insulted Leilene by saying she is not a good mother. When they arrived home, Larissa continued to insult her, gleefully stating in an interview that Leilene "is her child today." At the elimination ceremony Mo'Nique called Cristal, Saaphyri and Leilene on the carpet. Leilene was at risk for elimination due to her being emotionally weak, while Saaphyri was at risk for continually interrupting her opponent during the debate and Cristal for her lack of improvement. Leilene was sent back to the group by Mo'Nique, and Cristal was expelled for a perceived failure to change.

- Challenge Winner(s): Brooke, Courtney, Larissa, Schatar
- Bottom 3: Cristal, Leilene, and Saaphyri
- Expelled: Cristal

Reasons For Elimination

- Cristal - Although Saaphryi performed the worst and was the main reason that the positive team lost the challenge, Cristal was expelled because Mo'Nique felt that she was not making any improvement. It was also Cristal's third consecutive time on the carpet.

=== Big Stink at Charm School ===
First aired May 13, 2007

The nine remaining women set out to sell their own perfumes on the streets of Hollywood. They each created a custom scent, name, bottle, and poster with which to present their product. The girls learned about selling and making their perfume from Sarah Horowitz-Thran, CEO of Creative Scentualization. Mikki chose Larissa, Shay, and Brooke to be the CEOs. Their job was to choose their teammates and lead their team with designing and selling their products. Larissa chose Courtney and Saaphyri to be on her team, Shay chose Becky and Schatar, and Brooke chose the two remaining, Leilene and Darra. The girls returned home to make their names and posters. Larissa's team named their product "La'Sa'Cour", Shay's team named theirs "Icon", and Brooke's team named theirs "Flavor of Love". They started to sell their products in the allotted two hours. Brooke and Shay's teams did well, but Larissa's team was off to a slow start due to Courtney and Saaphyri going to the restroom for 20 minutes. At the end of the day, Keith and Mikki revealed that Brooke's team made the most money and were safe from expulsion. Angry from dealing with Brooke, Larissa went to talk with her boyfriend on the phone. The phone went dead and Brooke came down the stairs a few seconds later, leading Larissa to assume Brooke was responsible. They got into a fight over it in the kitchen. Larissa talked with Mo'Nique about it and Brooke was called to join them shortly after. Brooke accused Larissa of calling her a "white bitch". Mo'Nique got both girls to apologize to each other and they left to get ready for elimination. At elimination, Larissa and Shay were automatically called down to the carpet for being the CEOs of the losing teams. Courtney was also called down after Larissa was asked to choose another member of her team. Mo'Nique explained to Courtney that because she appeared comfortable being neutral and "staying on the fence," she was not giving herself a chance to grow and did not really need this as much as the rest of the girls. As a result, Courtney was expelled for being in the fence and not really stepping it up. Mo'Nique also gave Courtney the opportunity to tour with her for her comedy act.

- Challenge Winner(s): Brooke, Darra, Leilene
- Bottom 3: Courtney, Larissa, Shay
- Expelled: Courtney

Reasons For Elimination

- Courtney - Mo'Nique felt that Courtney didn't need Charm School as much as the others. Courtney was also accused of being too passive and staying "on the fence".

=== Give and Take ===
First aired May 20, 2007

The women's next challenge was to give their clothes away to a local charity thrift store. The girls divided into teams of two: Becky and Saaphyri, Shay and Larissa, Brooke and Leilene, and Schatar and Darra. The team who showed the most generosity and donated the largest amount of money would be safe from expulsion. The teams went in one-by-one to have their items checked over and priced accordingly by two employees. When her clothes were given low sale prices, Saaphyri became visibly upset and cried in the back of the store and blew her nose on clothes saying it made her feel worthless and devalued. She eventually composed herself and joined Becky to sell off the rest of their items. When the winners were announced, Mo'Nique told Shay and Larissa they had the largest amount of money. However, because Leilene gave away her deceased mother's ring, she and Brooke ended up with the largest amount donated. Brooke and Leilene won the competition and a shopping spree at Forever 21. Another team would get to join them so they chose Schatar and Darra. While the girls were gone, Shay and Larissa placed Leilene's school picture along with her mother and children's pictures under Schatar's mattress in an attempt to frame Schatar. The girls returned home and discovered the pictures were missing. Larissa impatiently hinted at Leilene to look in her sheets. Leilene looked under Schatar's mattress and found the pictures. She then confronted Schatar who became upset, saying that she thought Leilene did it to frame her. They both spoke with Mo'Nique who did not know the whole story but took the information into consideration. After the conversation with Mo'Nique, Schatar states that she hopes whoever set her up will "get the boot tonight" at elimination. This is ironic as Larissa's former nickname was "Bootz". At eliminations, Schatar and Darra were called down to the carpet as well as Larissa and Shay. Mo'Nique spoke with Schatar about the picture incident, and asked all the girls if they took it. Mo'Nique called Leilene over and commended her generosity for giving away her mother's ring. Mo'Nique then returned the ring to Leilene and said she would try to get Saaphyri's UGG boots back, too. Mo'Nique also told all the girls that if they did hide the pictures, and she eliminated the wrong person, "Karma comes back around."

- Challenge Winner(s): Brooke, Leilene
- Bottom 4: Darra, Larissa, Schatar, Shay
- Expelled: Darra & Schatar

Reasons For Elimination

- Schatar - Schatar had stolen Heather's clothes before, giving her a history of stealing. Also, she and Darra came in last place in the charity challenge.
- Darra - Darra was Schatar's partner and therefore was expelled along with her.

=== It's Mo's Birthday and I'll Cry If I Want To ===
First aired May 27, 2007

The six remaining girls learned the proper way to respond in a celebrity interview. Their patience was tested to the limit when the special guest interviewer turned out to be Tiffany "New York" Pollard. All of the girls except for Brooke and Becky seemed to do well in the challenge, especially Saaphyri, earning her immunity and exemption from elimination. Afterwards, the girls still wanted to get to the bottom of who stole Leilene's pictures. The picture theft inquisition soon turned into a dramatic scene of lies and backstabbing that had even guilty parties at each other's throats. Larissa then tells the others that Shay is the thief in an effort to save herself, leading Becky to unwittingly confront Shay. After a heated argument, Becky, guilty that she believed her friend Shay was the thief, announces she wants to quit and runs upstairs to pack her belongings. The insanity culminated during a surprise birthday party for Mo'Nique, where Mo'Nique found herself counseling Becky, convincing her not to leave. Becky expressed her guilt for accusing Shay, while Shay goes upstairs and listens in on the conversation. Shay then forgives Becky and then confessed to Mo'Nique that Larissa was the real thief and that she was an accomplice. Mo'Nique is stunned and tells Shay that those lies resulted in two innocent women (Darra and Schatar) being eliminated the last episode. She also explains that people go to prison for those reasons. After Mo'Nique's advice, Shay went to Larissa and told her about it. She thought that if Larissa confessed and apologized like her then Larissa would not be eliminated. But Larissa wouldn't listen and called Shay a rat. Shay, appalled that Larissa wouldn't do the same thing for her and would put on the blame on her calls her a backstabber and ends their alliance. At the elimination, Becky, Shay, and Larissa were brought to the carpet. Mo'Nique confronted Larissa about her actions. Larissa tried to justify them, partly by claiming that she did not really steal the pictures because she did not keep them herself. She also backstabbed Shay by saying that she was the one who came up with the idea of stealing the pictures. At this point, Larissa says she doesn't care anymore about the competition and challenges Mo'Nique. Mo'Nique announced to Becky, who did the worst in the interviews, that she was originally planned to be expelled, but expels Larissa for her cocky attitude, lies, and failure to change. She also warns Shay about being an enabler, and that she should do better with picking her friends. After the elimination, Mo'Nique announced that Larissa will be replaced by New York, but then laughs and says she is only joking.

- Challenge Winner(s): Saaphyri
- Bottom 3: Becky, Larissa, Shay
- Expelled: Larissa

Reasons For Elimination

- Larissa - While Becky performed the poorest in the interview challenge, Mo'Nique was fed up with Larissa's attitude and felt she wasn't going to change. Mo'Nique also learned that she was responsible for stealing Leilene's picture. It was also Larissa's third consecutive night on the carpet.

=== Tore Up from the Floor Up ===
First aired June 10, 2007

The five remaining girls learn about the four types of men to avoid in relationships: the Player (charismatic), the Professional (wealthy), the Pushover (sensitive), and the Parolee (high sexual aptitude). The one that they should look for is the Urban Renaissance Man, who possesses all four qualities in equal measure. Mo'Nique arranges the Charm School Prom, and invites seven eligible bachelors to the party. The girl who can pick out the one Urban Renaissance Man from the group that consists of Players, Professionals, Pushovers, and Parolees will be safe from elimination. At the Prom, Leilene stays with one man (the Professional) the whole night. Brooke acts incredibly promiscuous, becoming more so as she drinks throughout the night. Mo'Nique and the other Judges, watching this from a monitor, are appalled at what Brooke is doing. Saaphyri gets in a fight with the Parolee as well over his negative comments about large breasts. Eventually the prom ends and none of the girls choose the Urban Renaissance Man, meaning all the girls are at risk for expulsion. The next day the girls must decide who represented Charm School the best and the worst the previous night. The girl voted the best is safe from expulsion and the girl voted the worst representative is at risk for expulsion. Brooke and Shay plot for Shay to win and ask Leilene to vote for Shay. When the votes are tallied, however, Becky wins best representing Charm School. Brooke was voted the worst for her promiscuous behavior, and Mikki reveals that Leilene's vote against Brooke was the deciding vote. Brooke badly loses her composure and fights with Leilene. The other girls are shocked at Brooke's true colors and Leilene joins Becky and Saaphyri's alliance. At elimination, Becky is safe from expulsion for voted best representative, and Brooke is called down to the carpet for being voted the worst representative. Leilene and Saaphyri are also called down to the carpet. Mo'Nique first tells Saaphyri that she was wrong for fighting, but wasn't the worst, and she could leave the carpet. Leilene is told that she was only with one guy all night, and it wasn't even the right one and that she could do better, but she could leave the carpet. Mo'Nique then says that Brooke is the "whore" of Charm School, which offends Brooke, and shocks the others to an extent. Mo'Nique then explains that her behavior was whore-like, and for that reason, Brooke is expelled. Before she left, Brooke turned to the camera and told the viewers, "And no I'm not gonna f*cking spit, America!", referring to her spitting incident in the first season of Flavor of Love. Leilene then states that she is glad Brooke went home after seeing Brooke's true colors.

- Challenge Winner(s): Becky
- Bottom 3: Brooke, Leilene, Saaphyri
- Expelled: Brooke

Reasons For Elimination

- Brooke - Brooke was voted the worst representative of the challenge, thus granting her a spot on the carpet. Also, Mo'Nique and the judges were disgusted with Brooke's "whore-like" behavior during the challenge, after having seen her almost-flawless record throughout the season.

=== Semester Recap ===
First aired June 17, 2007

A summary of the eight past episodes, plus bonus never-before seen clips:

- Mo'Nique ordering pizza and fried chicken for the thirteen girls
- Brooke urinating in a water bottle on the bus after leaving the bar
- Shay and Saaphyri call Brooke and Leilene out for not picking Shay, Saaphyri, and Becky for the shopping spree at Forever 21, and Darra for being fake.
- An extended version on Larissa and Leilene's fight

=== Ghettin' Phabulous ===
First aired July 1, 2007

The final four girls compete in a game-show style Q&A to see who has learned the most throughout the season; the first girl to miss three questions is expelled from the competition. The catch to the game is that each girl gets to decide who to ask their question to. Becky, Leilene, and Saaphyri team up together and decide that they would ask Shay all of the questions. Shay gets eliminated when asked "Which fork do you use to eat frog legs?", saying the table fork. Mo'Nique then says it was a trick question and the answer was fingers. The three remaining girls are then given one hour to write a speech explaining what it would mean to them to win the money and to explain what they learned. Mo'Nique acknowledged that Shay had been ganged-up on and convinced to come back and judge the ladies on their speeches to show that you can play a person one time, but have to need the person another time. Leilene and Becky both read their speeches on paper, but Saaphyri comes out and says that she does not have anything, and begins to speak "off the top of her head". Leilene talks about using the money towards a better future for her and her kids. Becky says if she wins the money that she would repay Saaphyri's kindness back by giving her $25,000, half the money prize. During Saaphyri's speech, she says that the money would be used for her to have a place that she could call home, leaving Mo'Nique and Shay in tears. Saaphyri and Shay reconcile and forgive each other and Mo'Nique then tells Shay she must choose the final two. Shay first picks Saaphyri because her speech was from the heart and it moved her the most. However, Shay could not bring herself to choose between Becky and Leilene. Because of this, Mo'Nique believes that Shay is now a grown woman, and makes the decision for her. Mo'Nique chooses Leilene as the second finalist and eliminates Becky because she felt that she did not need the money as much as Leilene or Saaphyri did. Mo'Nique tells the two remaining ladies that tomorrow they should get ready to have a make-over. During the final elimination ceremony Leilene was told she did not win but was given the opportunity to go into modeling thanks in part by Dean Keith. Saaphyri is crowned Charm School Queen and breaks down into tears, thanking God that he helped her. As a final gift after the $50,000 check, Mo'Nique brings out her UGG boots back telling her that she said she'd get them back.

- Final Four: Becky, Leilene, Saaphyri, Shay
  - Lost Challenge: Shay
- Judge: Shay
  - Bottom 2: Becky, Leilene
  - Expelled: Becky
- Final Two: Leilene, Saaphyri
  - Runner-Up: Leilene
  - Winner: Saaphyri

Reasons For Elimination

- Shay - Shay failed the final exam challenge and was eliminated. However, she came back and became the judge for the next challenge.
- Becky - Mo'Nique felt that Leilene and Saaphyri needed the money more than her.
- Leilene - Became the runner-up.

=== Reunion Show ===
First aired July 8, 2007

Twelve (since Heather did not show up) of the thirteen girls are brought back to discuss the series. The reunion is hosted by La La. Schatar is brought up to discuss the events at the Firestone Vineyard. She gets into an argument with Becky and Cristal when she makes a comment that she never called anyone the B-Word. Cristal calls out Schatar for being a thief, by telling her that stealing is a lot worse than profanity. Becky confronts Schatar for saying that everybody got naked and slept around. Mo'Nique interrupts it and scolds them for it. Brooke is brought up to discuss the prom. She argues with Saaphyri and Becky about her promiscuous behavior at the prom. Saaphyri and Leilene are brought up next and discuss what they have been doing since the reunion. During Leilene's talk, Mo'Nique gives her a runner-up prize of $10,000. Then, Becky and Shay are brought up on stage, in which the two of them speak on Shay's elimination and Becky's role in plotting it. Shay is vocally upset, but civil, and Shay and Becky try to make up. Next, Larissa argues with Shay and Mo'Nique comes out and stops it. Larissa then gets into an argument with Mo'Nique and Mo's security and Larissa's mother walk onto the stage, unhappy with the way Mo'Nique is talking to Larissa. Mo'Nique then defends herself about why she was so hard on Larissa, saying she only did it because she loved her all while Larissa's mother and Mo's security watches on with their arms crossed. Mo'Nique then proceeds to explain to the girls that the way they are acting is not right and that America is watching and they should not portray black women in the disrespectful way that they do at which point Shay gets a reality check and apologizes to America for the way she portrayed herself. Larissa, however, continues arguing with Mo'Nique while Mo'Nique tries to get through to Larissa on how she is acting and how it is only embarrassing herself. The reunion ends while Mo'Nique and Larissa are having a heart-to-heart.

== Reception ==
Virginia Heffernan of The New York Times claimed that the series did not break the mold of the reality television genre, although she praised it as a portrayal of "the rawest manifestations of social conflicts".

== See also ==
- List of Flavor of Love contestants
