= I Love Money season 2 =

I Love Money
- Season 2
- Cast of I Love Money 2 (from left to right): Back: Onyx, It, Saaphyri, The Entertainer, T-Weed, Bonez, Buddha, Tamara, Myammee, Tailor Made Front: Angelique, Leilene, Heat, Cali, Buckwild, Ice, Milf, Prancer, 20 Pack
- Presented by: Craig "C.J." Jackson
- No. of contestants: 19
- Winner: Myammee
- Location: Manzanillo, Mexico
- No. of episodes: 15

Release
- Original network: VH1
- Original release: February 2 – May 10, 2009

Season chronology
- ← Previous; Season 1 Next → Season 4

The second season of the VH1 reality television series I Love Money, created by The Surreal Life executive producers Cris Abrego and Mark Cronin, premiered on February 2, 2009, with Craig J. Jackson returning to host. The 19 contestants for the second season were drawn from I Love New York, Flavor of Love, Rock of Love with Bret Michaels, and Real Chance of Love to compete in physical and mental challenges, aiming for a $250,000 grand prize. Production began in late October 2008 & wrapped November 2008.

== Contestants ==
Name	Original Show	1st Team	2nd Team	Eliminated
Angela "Myammee" Pitts	Flavor of Love 3	Green	Green	Winner
George "Tailor Made" Weisgerber	I Love New York 2	Gold	Gold	Episode 14 (2nd)
Kwame "It" Smalls	I Love New York 2	Gold	Green	Episode 14 (3rd)
Mercedes "Prancer" Clausen	Flavor of Love 3	Gold	Gold	Episode 14 (4th)
Saaphyri Windsor	Flavor of Love 2	Gold	Green	Episode 14 (5th)
Angelique "Frenchy" Morgan	Rock of Love 2	Gold	Green	Episode 13 (6th)
Amanda "Ice" Habrowski	Flavor of Love 3	Green	Gold	Episode 12 (7th)
Nico "20 Pack" Vasquez	I Love New York 2	Gold	Gold	Episode 11 (8th)
Becky "Buckwild" Johnston	Flavor of Love 2	Green	Gold	Episode 10 (9th)
Christine "Cali" Ly	Real Chance of Love	Gold	Green	Episode 9 (10th)
Frank "The Entertainer" Maresca	I Love New York 2	Gold	Green	Episode 8 (11th)
Kevin "Bonez" Peters	I Love New York	Green	Gold	Episode 7 (12th)
Jason "Heat" Rosell	I Love New York	Gold	Gold	Episode 6 (13th)
Ahmo "Milf" Hight†	Real Chance of Love	Green	Green	Episode 5 (14th)
Ezra "Buddha" Masters	I Love New York 2	Green	No Team	Episode 4 (15th)
Kevin "T-Weed" Watson	I Love New York	Green		Episode 4 (16th)
Leilene "Smiley" Ondrade	Flavor of Love	Green		Episode 3 (17th)
William "Onyx" Lash	I Love New York	Green		Episode 2 (18th)
Tamara Witmer	Rock of Love	No Team		Episode 1 (19th)

== Episode progress ==
Contestant	Episode															
Contestant	1	2	3	4		5	6	7	8	9	10	11	12	13	14	
Myammee	SAFE	**SAFE**	SAFE	SAFE	SAFE	BTM3	WIN	WIN	SAFE	BTM3	SAFE	WIN	SAFE	SAFE	WIN	WINNER
Tailor Made	SAFE	WIN	WIN	WIN	SAFE	WIN	SAFE	SAFE	**WIN**	WIN	SAFE	SAFE	SAFE	SAFE	BTM3	VOID
It	BTM3	WIN	WIN	WIN	SAFE	SAFE	WIN	WIN	SAFE	BTM2	SAFE	SAFE	BTM3	BTM2	BTM2	VOID
Prancer	SAFE	WIN	WIN	WIN	SAFE	**WIN**	SAFE	SAFE	WIN	SAFE	SAFE	SAFE	BTM2	WIN	VOID	
Saaphyri	SAFE	WIN	**WIN**	WIN	**WIN**	SAFE	WIN	WIN	**BTM2**	SAFE	BTM3	BTM2	WIN	BTM3	VOID	
Angelique	SAFE	WIN	WIN	WIN	BTM3	SAFE	WIN	**WIN**	BTM3	SAFE	BTM3	BTM3	SAFE	VOID		
Ice	SAFE	SAFE	SAFE	SAFE	BTM2	WIN	**SAFE**	SAFE	WIN	SAFE	SAFE	SAFE	VOID			
20 Pack	**WIN**	WIN	WIN	WIN	**WIN**	WIN	BTM2	BTM3	WIN	SAFE	WIN	VOID				
Buckwild	SAFE	BTM3	BTM3	BTM3	SAFE	WIN	BTM3	BTM2	WIN	SAFE	VOID					
Cali	SAFE	WIN	WIN	WIN	SAFE	**BTM3**	WIN	WIN	SAFE	VOID						
The Entertainer	SAFE	WIN	WIN	**WIN**	SAFE	SAFE	**WIN**	WIN	VOID							
Bonez	SAFE	SAFE	SAFE	**SAFE**	SAFE	WIN	SAFE	**VOID**								
Heat	SAFE	**WIN**	WIN	WIN	SAFE	WIN	VOID									
Milf	SAFE	SAFE	**BTM2**	BTM2	SAFE	VOID										
Buddha	SAFE	SAFE	SAFE	SAFE	VOID											
T–Weed	**WIN**	SAFE	SAFE	VOID												
Smiley	BTM2	BTM2	VOID													
Onyx	SAFE	VOID														
Tamara	VOID															

1st Teams
The contestant was chosen to be on the Gold Team by 20 Pack.
The contestant was chosen to be on the Green Team by T-Weed

2nd Teams
The contestant was chosen to be on the Gold Team by 20 Pack.
The contestant was chosen to be on the Green Team by Saaphyri.
Team captains are noted in bold text. Dead Last Losers are noted in italic text.

Competition
The contestant won the competition.
The contestant was Paymaster.
The contestant was on the winning team and was safe.
The contestant did not win the challenge, but was not chosen to be in the Bottom 3.
The contestant was at risk of not being picked for a team or they were voted into the Bottom 3, but was not eliminated.
The contestant was the last to be picked for a team or they were voted into the Bottom 2, but was not eliminated.
The contestant was eliminated, thus their check was voided.
The contestant was last in the challenge and was automatically eliminated.

Notes
Episode 1 — Only the team captains (20 Pack and T-Weed) were safe from elimination.
Episode 4 — New teams were formed and only the team captains (Saaphyri and 20 Pack) were safe from elimination.
Episode 8 — Craig announced there would be no more teams.

== Episodes ==
=== Episode 1: It's a Dirty Game, But Someone Has To Play It ===
First aired February 2, 2009

19 contestants arrived to compete on the second season, and, like the previous season, the contestants had to jump off the boat into the water. Bonez ends up losing some of his hair products into the water, while Myammee worries about getting her synthetic weave wet. While introducing himself to the contestants, Craig notes that both The Entertainer and Heat were from last season and that Entertainer actually voted off Heat. While Entertainer denies it saying that was his team's decision, they decide to put it behind them and form an alliance. After revealing what each contestant would do with the money, the teams competed in a challenge to become team captains. The challenge was called the Mud Pit, where each contestant would have one minute to swim in the mud and find as many gold coins within the time limit. Leilene did the worst with no coins, while Tamara has a fear of water, thus found only a few coins. In the end, 20 Pack and T-Weed eventually won.

Place	Name	Coins
1	20 Pack	26
2	T-Weed	22
3	Buddha	21
4	Prancer	20
5	The Entertainer	19
6	Buckwild; Heat; Milf	18
9	Cali	16
10	Saaphyri	15
11	Ice; Tailor Made	14
13	Onyx	11
14	Bonez; It; Myammee	10
17	Tamara	7
18	Angelique	3
19	Leilene	0

The contestant won as Gold Team Captain.
The contestant won as Green Team Captain.
The contestant lost the challenge.
The contestant did not get any coins at all, and was automatically disqualified.

Before picking teams, 20 Pack and T-Weed begin talking to the other contestants and from there, alliances begin to form with The Entertainer, Heat, 20 Pack and eventually Tailor Made (who originally tried to form an alliance with Buddha) in one, and Saaphyri, Buckwild and Leilene in another. 20 Pack picks The Entertainer, Heat, Prancer, Angelique, Saaphyri, Cali, and Tailor Made. T-Weed picks Onyx, Bonez, Myammee, Buckwild, Milf, Buddha, and Ice. 20 Pack and T-Weed originally had an agreement to not have Buddha picked on either team, as he was a big physical threat, but he was eventually chosen to be on the Green Team by T-Weed, much to the displeasure of The Entertainer. It was down to It, Leilene and Tamara for the final picks, and then 20 Pack picked It for the Gold Team. When Leilene and Tamara had a chance to plead their case, Leilene said she may of messed up, but she is still a good player, while Tamara does not make much of an effort. T-Weed decides to pick the final girl by arm wrestling, to which Leilene won. Not chosen to be on either team was Tamara, who felt betrayed because both 20 Pack and T-Weed promised her she would not go home, but neither one of them picked her, and humorously stormed off the set, by, like on season one of Rock Of Love unintentionally walking into a closet.

- Challenge: Mud Pit
- Challenge Winners: 20 Pack (1st), T-Weed (2nd)
- Gold Team: 20 Pack, The Entertainer, Heat, Prancer, Angelique, Saaphyri, Cali, Tailor Made, It
- Green Team: T-Weed, Onyx, Bonez, Myammee, Buckwild, Milf, Buddha, Ice, Leilene
- Bottom 3: It, Leilene, Tamara
- Eliminated: Tamara

Reason For Elimination

- **Tamara** - Even though 20 Pack and T-Weed promised to keep her in the house, 20 Pack ended up picking It last and T-Weed made Leilene and Tamara arm wrestle to see who was stronger. Leilene won and was then chosen over Tamara, who felt betrayed.

=== Episode 2: Stripper Moves ===
First aired February 9, 2009

The episode begins with Buddha sweet talking Leilene (who has a crush on him), with Saaphyri and Buckwild looking on. Each team must pick a new captain for their next challenge. The Green Team picks Myammee for their new captain, while the Gold Team picks Heat. The challenge is the Boston Knockout, which is based on the first season of I Love New York, when Chance knocked Mr. Boston out of the boxing ring. The ring is suspended over the water and two people will fight each other with boxing gloves and if somebody gets knocked down or gets knocked out of the ring, the other team will get a point. First up is The Entertainer vs. Buddha, and Buddha knees Entertainer, and wins a point for the Green Team. Next, Ice and Tailor Made fight, with Tailor Made winning a point for the Gold Team. It and Bonez fight, with Bonez winning a point for the Green Team. T-Weed and 20 Pack fight each other, with 20 Pack knocking T-Weed out of the ring and falls into the water, thus another point went to the Gold Team. 20 Pack reveals in his interview that he broke his hand because of the fight. Cali and Milf fight each other, with Cali winning another point for the Gold Team. Onyx and Prancer fight each other next. Onyx promised Heat and the rest of his alliance that he would throw the challenge, but, instead, ends up knocking Prancer out of the ring, resulting in another point for the Green Team, thus tying the game. For the final match, Heat and Myammee fight with Heat winning, meaning the Gold Team was the winner.

Round	Match Up	Winner
1	Buddha vs. The Entertainer	Buddha
2	Ice vs. Tailor Made	Tailor Made
3	Bonez vs. It	Bonez
4	20 Pack vs. T-Weed	20 Pack
5	Cali vs. Milf	Cali
6	Onyx vs. Prancer	Onyx
7	Heat vs. Myammee	Heat

Saaphyri and Buckwild tried to convince Leilene to vote Buddha into the box in the vault. In the vault, all but Buckwild, vote Leilene into the box, which hurts Leilene to know Buddha betrayed her. Onyx is voted into the box also, and when Buckwild gets voted in, she flips out, hoping to stall, but does not run out of time, and the decision is final by the team. Before the power outing, Buckwild and Saaphyri tell Leilene if she quits the game, the Green Team will have to go back into the vault and vote somebody else into the box, which she is certain will be Buddha. Leilene tearfully agrees to do so, agreeing on a pinky swear saying their friendship is more important to her than winning the money. On the power outing, the four contenders go on a boat ride. Leilene finally tells Heat that Buckwild and Saaphyri want her to throw the game. Buckwild gets mad at Leilene for breaking the pinky swear for telling Heat. On the one on one time, Heat selects Leilene. The two talk about the plan and Leilene admits she does not want to quit. Out of desperation, Leilene falls for Heat and says she wants to spend more time with him, and then the two kiss. Back at the house, Heat talks to Leilene into quitting, with Leilene still undecided with what she wants to do. At elimination, Heat gives the first check to Buckwild. Heat then calls up Onyx and tells him because of his failure to throw the challenge, he can not trust him, and thus his check is voided. Onyx then says Heat just eliminated his only friend in the house.

- Challenge: Boston Knockout
- Winner: Gold Team
- Loser: Green Team
- Pay Master: Heat
- Bottom 3: Buckwild, Leilene, Onyx
- Eliminated: Onyx

Reason For Elimination

- **Onyx** - Onyx failed to throw the challenge and Heat felt he could not be trusted.

=== Episode 3: It's in the Cards ===
First aired February 16, 2009

This episode begins where Episode Two left off, with Leilene wanting to talk to Buckwild about breaking off the pinky swear earlier, but Buckwild does not want to talk to her. Meanwhile, inside the house, Buddha and Milf form an alliance. Milf admits that she feels an attraction to Buddha. Heat and Leilene cuddle and make-out. The other girls and Buddha think Leilene is acting like a ho for always hooking up with the guys in the house. When Leilene hears of this, she feels hurt and wants to leave the house, and even packs her bags, but changes her mind and sleeps outside. Deciding she has suffered enough, Buckwild and Saaphyri convince Leilene to come back in the house, and share a touching moment. The next day, Milf is selected the new captain of the Green Team, while Saaphyri is picked captain for the Gold Team. The new challenge is called the Breath Mint Shootout, which is based on Flavor Of Love 3 when Shy had bad breath. The challenge is a three-on-two soccer game where two people will play defense in front of a giant cardboard mouth, and one will have to kick the ball away from the mouth, while the other will have to play goalie with a giant toothbrush, while three members of the other team will play offense and will have to kick the soccer ball into the goal. Milf picks Saaphyri and Angelique to play defense, and Ice, Myammee, and Bonez to play offense. After two goals are scored, Saaphyri flips out at Angelique for not even trying to play offense, slams the toothbrush onto the ground, and shrieks, "I quit! I quit!" Buckwild then convinces Saaphyri not to quit, and eventually, Saaphyri and Angelique switch positions, and quickly turn the game around and end up stopping a lot of the goals. After blocking four goals, the Green Team now has to play defense, which Saaphyri ends up picking T-Weed and Leilene playing defense. Gold Team ends up winning with more goals. Knowing she is at risk being voted into the box, Milf and Buddha talk and Buddha says if Milf can convince Leilene to move upstairs into his alliance, he will not vote her into the box. Milf agrees, and follows Leilene around the house and tries to persuade her into moving in the alliance, but Leilene says no. In the vault, Milf, Leilene, and Buckwild are voted into the box. Upset with Buddha for breaking his promise, Milf announces she is quitting and leaves the vault. Saaphyri immediately comforts Milf and tries to convince her not quit. Buddha tries to talk to Milf, and Saaphyri and him fight. Buddha, fed up with this, yells at Saaphyri and tries to shove her away from Milf. Not appreciating Buddha yelling at her home girl, Buckwild steps up and yells at Buddha. Buddha yells at her to stay out of it, and then leaves. On the power outing, the girls meet a fortune teller for advice. Buckwild goes first and is told that she's making her life harder for herself by acting like a bad girl. Milf is told to be careful whom to trust, and Leilene is told she's bad luck and using her body too much instead of her brain, and Saaphyri asks who should she trust between Milf and Leilene, and the fortune teller tells her Milf. At lunch, Saaphyri calls out Leilene for breaking the pinky swear, and Leilene says she made a mistake and says sorry, and Saaphyri tells her she needs to stop making mistakes, and Leilene leaves the table. On the one on one time, Saaphyri talks to Milf and asks her if she can trust her and if she needed her to throw the challenge she would, and Milf replies, "I have to think about it." At elimination, Saaphyri gives the first check to Buckwild. Before giving out the second check, Saaphyri asks both remaining ladies what loyalty means to them and Milf flubs on her answer, while Leilene says she has been friends with her for a long time and can be trustworthy. Saaphyri calls up Leilene and tells her she loves her, but she is voiding her check. After voiding Leilene's check, Craig asks Saaphyri why she voided her friend's check and Saaphyri explains that she felt that Leilene is only there for love and that all the drama is stressing her out, so she wanted felt this was the best decision for her. Leilene says she still loves Saaphyri, and thought she was there for love and feels this game is not cut out for her.

- Challenge: Breath Mint Shootout
- Winner: Gold Team
- Loser: Green Team
- Pay Master: Saaphyri
- Bottom 3: Buckwild, Leilene, Milf
- Eliminated: Leilene

Reason For Elimination

- **Leilene** - Although Saaphyri was friends with Leilene, she voided her check because Saaphyri believed that Leilene was only there to find love. Saaphyri also felt the game was causing Leilene a lot of emotional distress, and eliminated her out of mercy.

=== Episode 4: Kiss my... ===
First aired February 23, 2009

Milf is seen arguing with her roommates Buddha, Myammee, and T-Weed, for their betrayal to her for voting her into the box. Milf, fed up with this, moves downstairs. The next day, Craig hints that the next challenge will be, like last year, "a mouthful". For the Green Team, Bonez is picked for team captain, while The Entertainer is picked for the Gold Team. When they arrive at the challenge site, Craig tells them that the challenge is called, "The Kiss Off 2", which is based on the challenge on the last season of I Love Money. Craig has a bag of colored coins, and when one contestant picks a coin that matches another contestant's coin, they will be paired together. On the Green Team, Milf and Buddha get paired up together, Myammee and T-Weed are paired together, Bonez picked an odd colored coin and was not able to play, leaving Buckwild and Ice to be together. On the Gold Team, Prancer and Angelique are together, Heat and It, Saaphyri and Tailor Made, 20 Pack and Entertainer are paired together, while Cali picked the odd colored coin, also meaning she will not play the game. Craig then throws a twist in the game: The pairs will not be locking lips, but instead, will be kissing one of their butts, which is based on when the past contestants from I Love Money when the contestants would kiss up to other contestants, and literally, when Nibblz kissed Buckeey's butt on a dare on Flavor Of Love 2. The rules of the challenge is only the lips can touch the butt, no hands; the contestants have to remain on a beam, and the lips must keep touching the butt. Immediately in the game, Milf pushed Buddha off their beam meaning they were out. Buckwild threw the game, meaning T-Weed and Myammee were the only pair left from The Green Team. The Entertainer then gets him and 20 Pack disqualified by Entertainer giving 20 Pack "a smack on the ass". Tailor Made's lips then slip off of Saaphyri's butt, meaning they were also out, and then Heat falls off the beam and used his hand to touch the ground to stop himself, resulting in another disqualification. It is down to T-Weed and Myammee vs. Prancer and Angelique. T-Weed starts sweating and then his feet struggle to stay on the beam, and then he falls off, which resulted in another win for the Gold Team.

Place	Match Up
1	Angelique & Prancer
2	Myammee & T-Weed
3	Heat & It
4	Saaphyri & Tailor Made
5	20 Pack & The Entertainer
6	Buckwild & Ice (WITHDREW)
7	Buddha & Milf (WITHDREW)

Back at the house, Buddha thinks T-Weed is the one to blame for the loss of the game, saying the challenge was easy and he was kissing the "sexiest girl in the house." Buckwild and Saaphyri scheme to get Buddha into the box, and ask Bonez to vote for him in the vault. Bonez slowly said "yes." In the vault, Milf and Buckwild and T-Weed are voted into the box. T-Weed, Buckwild, and Milf voted for Buddha, but were outnumbered. Buddha and T-Weed fight in the vault, while Bonez told Craig that those were the official votes, and the three checks are dropped into the box. On the power outing, Buckwild flirts with The Entertainer, and T-Weed pleads his case. On the one on one time, Entertainer picks T-Weed. T-Weed explains that he wants Buddha gone and if Entertainer keeps him in, T-Weed said he would deliver Buddha's head on a "silver platter." The Entertainer tells T-Weed that before picking teams, he promised Entertainer he would not pick Buddha, but he did anyway and now he was in the box because of him, making Entertainer question if T-Weed could be loyal or not. At elimination, The Entertainer gives the first check to Buckwild. Entertainer then called up T-Weed and said he should never have picked Buddha on his team, and Entertainer does not feel he is loyal enough, and then voids his check. After Milf gets her check, Craig then drops a bomb and says this is the point of the game where they like to shake things up, and then splits up the boys and the girls, and gives them coins and sharpies and asks them to write which person of their gender they trusted the most. For the girls, Saaphyri had the most votes, while 20 Pack had the most votes from the boys. Craig then tells them that they are doing new teams. Saaphyri picked The Entertainer, Milf, Cali, It, Myammee, and Angelique for the Green Team, while 20 Pack picked Heat, Buckwild, Bonez, Prancer, and Tailor Made for the Gold Team, leaving the final pick between Ice and Buddha. 20 Pack ultimately picks Ice. Buddha's check is then voided, and Buddha said that now that the scapegoat is gone, everybody's true natures will come out.

- Challenge: The Kiss Off 2
- Winner: Gold Team
- Loser: Green Team
- Pay Master: The Entertainer
- Bottom 3: Buckwild, Milf, T-Weed
- Eliminated: T-Weed
- Team Captains: Saaphyri (1st), 20 Pack (2nd)
- Green Team: Saaphyri, The Entertainer, Cali, It, Milf, Myammee, Angelique
- Gold Team: 20 Pack, Heat, Buckwild, Prancer, Tailor Made, Ice, Bonez
- Bottom 3: Angelique, Buddha, Ice
- Eliminated: Buddha

Reason For Elimination

- **T-Weed** - The Entertainer still held a grudge against him for going back on his word that he will not pick Buddha.
- **Buddha** - For the final team picks, Buddha was not selected because he was seen as the strongest player in the house and potentially a huge threat.

=== Episode 5: Alliances Are Dead - Or Are They? ===
First aired March 2, 2009

After being switched to the Green Team, after being on the Gold Team for two years, The Entertainer is bummed about now no longer being on the Gold Team and worries about his alliances being on the opposite team, so he burns his Gold Team shirt, while Angelique and Heat look on. Down in the pool, Cali and Prancer discuss being in an alliance, and now being separated. The next day, Prancer is picked to be captain for the Gold Team, while Cali is picked for the Green Team. The new challenge is "Gold Diggers", which is based on Flavor Of Love 3 when Flav eliminated Hotlanta for being a "gold digger". The challenge was the teams would go on a scavenger hunt, while tied together, to find a key to unlock themselves and dig for gold. The team that found the gold first would be safe from elimination. At the first station, the instructions require the team to pick up coconuts and throw them in a net, until the net dropped. Green Team passed the task quite quickly, while the Gold Team struggled. When the Green Team arrived at the second station, the instructions say that the team needs to knock down their piñata to receive their key and seven pairs of gloves. The Entertainer wastes no time and gets the piñata to break open by imagining his parents in the piñata and threw rocks at it rage, until the gloves and key fell out and the Green Team walked off. The Gold Team finally reaches their piñata and find it rather difficult to break open the piñata, until Heat grabbed a long stick and broke it open. When the Green Team arrived at their third station, the instructions are in Spanish, yet the Green Team can't translate, even when they have a Spanish dictionary, while the Gold Team wing it, since Heat speaks Spanish, and it turns out that the final key is underneath the box. The Green Team, fly into panic, not knowing what to do, and then Saaphyri knocks over the box and finds the key and head off, to see the Gold Team (who were allowed to untie themselves) digging for the gold. The Green Team tries to find the gold, but the Gold Team find the treasure chest and get the gold, winning the challenge. Back at the house, Saaphyri and Myammee discuss the challenge and who they think is going into the box and think Cali threw the challenge so Prancer could be Pay Master. Saaphyri then talks to 20 Pack about protecting their alliance and trying to get rid of Cali and Prancer's alliance. Saaphyri then approaches Cali and asks her if she threw the challenge, but Cali denied it, saying she put too much thought into it. In the vault, Saaphyri handpicks Milf, Cali, and Myammee to be in the box, while everybody else agrees with her. When Prancer talks to Entertainer's alliance, they all said Prancer should get rid of Cali, but Prancer tearfully disagrees saying Cali's her "best friend." On the power outing, the girls go zip-lining. Meanwhile, Tailor Made and Ice plot to form an alliance between them, Bonez, Prancer, Myammee, and Cali, if Prancer keeps Cali in the house. At lunch, Prancer calls out Milf for being quiet and Milf blurts, "It's elimination!" On the one on one time, Prancer picks Myammee. Myammee admits in her interview that she is unsure about Prancer, since Prancer's responsible for her elimination on Flavor Of Love 3, and Prancer asks her if she safes her from elimination, if she'll be loyal to her, and Myammee says yes. At elimination, Prancer gives each girl a final plea on why they should stay; Cali says she does not want to go, while Myammee struggles on her part, thinking Prancer is not going to save her, since they're not friends. Prancer then says Cali will not be going home and then tells Craig to void Milf's check. The Entertainer and Buckwild, needless to say, were not happy for this decision. After she and Cali receive their checks, Myammee quietly thanks Prancer, trying to hide their alliance.

- Challenge: Gold Diggers
- Winner: Gold Team
- Loser: Green Team
- Pay Master: Prancer
- Bottom 3: Cali, Milf, Myammee
- Eliminated: Milf

Reason For Elimination

- **Milf** - Prancer chose Cali and Myammee over Milf, feeling that Milf was not trustworthy.

=== Episode 6: The Chickens Who Come Home to Roost ===
First aired March 9, 2009

The Entertainer is talking to his alliance and thinks Tailor Made is a snake for hiding his alliance behind Entertainer's back. Tailor Made, meanwhile, talks to his alliance and tells them to keep the alliance a secret. The next day, The Entertainer is chosen for captain for the Green Team, while Ice is the captain for the Gold Team. When the contestants arrive at the challenge site, Craig tells them that back by popular demand, the contestants will be doing the Chicken-A-Pult, first done last year. The challenge, like last year, is based on when Hottie from Flavor of Love cooked Flav's mother a raw chicken and was eliminated soon after. Four people will have to catch the flying chickens that are launched by the catapult, while three people have to build and launch the catapult. On the Gold Team, Ice, Prancer, and Buckwild are the builders, while Heat, 20 Pack, Bonez, and Tailor Made are the catchers. The Gold Team gets their catapult put up first, but the chicken is launched backwards. On the Green Team, The Entertainer catches the first chicken. The Gold Team continues launching the chickens, but they keep going the wrong way. Entertainer keeps catching the chickens, but on the third catch, the chicken slams into his ribs, but he soldiers on, catching two more chickens, but stalls on his last one, but then finally places it on the plate, meaning the Green Team has won their first challenge. At the house, Prancer admits being caught between the two alliances, and isn't sure what to do yet. Inside the vault, everybody in the secret alliance (Ice, Tailor Made, Prancer and Bonez) vote Buckwild, Heat, and 20 Pack into the box. Unhappy seeing his alliance members in the box, The Entertainer gets mad at Tailor Made, as do Buckwild and Heat. Buckwild tells Tailor Made that she will throw every challenge until Tailor Made is off the show, to which Tailor Made just mutters, "Okay." Heat throws a fit and kicks things. Before going on the Power Outing, Heat and 20 Pack drink a lot of alcohol. On the Power Outing, 20 Pack and Heat are drunk and slur their speech. The Entertainer then thinks Ice may have thrown the challenge, so the rest of the alliance could vote the three into the box. On the one on one time, Entertainer picks Heat. Heat slurs that he may not be a smart man, but he sees that the members on the Gold Team betrayed him and wants them out. Entertainer says in his interview that he loves Heat, but he hates seeing him drunk. Back at the house, The Entertainer asks his team who they want to see go home: 20 Pack, or Heat. Before the vote, Heat cries and says he really wants the money and doesn't want to leave. 20 Pack also cries. Myammee calls both of their pity cases "BS." At elimination, Buckwild is called up and receives her check first, and Buckwild thanks Entertainer with a kiss, which disgusts the other cast mates. The Entertainer calls up 20 Pack, and thinks 20 Pack is the biggest threat, but still doesn't know if he should keep him or not, so he asks the Green team if he should keep him or not. The Green Team says to give 20 Pack the check. The Entertainer agrees and gives him the check, and 20 Pack drops to his knees and cries. 20 Pack approaches the Gold Team and spits on the ground and calls them traitors. Heat cries, and The Entertainer feels bad, and hugs him and says he's sorry for getting rid of him again (The Entertainer eliminated Heat on the first season) and Heat raves, "We didn't come here as friends, but goddamn it, I made a real friendship with you! I respect you, man!" and the rest of their alliance hug Heat. Craig voids Heat's check and Heat leaves. In his interview, Entertainer yells and says making him get rid of somebody from his alliance was the final straw and says he will do anything to stay in the house, and the editors edit to make Entertainer blow up for humor effects.

- Challenge: Chicken-A-Pult
- Winner: Green Team
- Loser: Gold Team
- Pay Master: The Entertainer
- Bottom 3: 20 Pack, Buckwild, Heat
- Eliminated: Heat

Reason For Elimination

- **Heat** - The Entertainer had a hard time choosing between 20 Pack and Heat, so he had his team decide for him and they decided on Heat.

=== Episode 7: Are You There, God? It's Me ===
First aired March 16, 2009

The episode picks up where last episode picks up when Heat was eliminated. 20 Pack promises to "break Tailor Made's head open." Buckwild rants at Prancer that she needs to make a decision to which alliance she belongs in and calls her a "turtle-faced bitch." Buckwild then grabs Tailor Made's clothes and throws them around the room and Tailor lunges for her and the producers have to break it up. The next day, Craig hints the challenge will be something to do with bathing suits. On the Gold Team, Bonez is picked to be team captain, while Angelique is picked for the Green Team. When the teams arrive at the beach for their next challenge, Craig tells them the challenge is called "Fire and Ice", which is based on the events of hot and cold moments on the shows. The rules of the game is each team has to get six gold coins from a block of ice and put them in their team box, and with each coin retrieved from the block of ice, the team captain has to take off one piece of Mexican clothing and whichever team gets six coins first wins the challenge. During the challenge both 20 Pack and Myammee throw the challenge, so that their alliances will win. Green Team gets the first three coins, and then the Gold Team gets their first coin. It eventually comes down to a 5/5 tie, making the next coin the winning coin. The Gold Team gets the final coin, however, Buckwild grabs the coin and throws it into the ocean. Bonez is frustrated to see Buckwild throw yet another challenge. The Green Team gets the final coin and win the game, making Angelique the Paymaster. At the house, Angelique takes full advantage of her power and makes out with 20 Pack and tries to get him to have sex with her, but 20 Pack runs off scared. Meanwhile, outside, It plays truth or dare with Saaphyri, 20 Pack and The Entertainer and Saaphyri dares It to kiss her and he does. 20 Pack then dares It to suck on Saaphyri's toes the way the Entertainer did on I Love New York 2 and It also does. Inside the mansion, Tailor Made and Prancer plot their plan for the vault, so they go over who's in which alliance, but they do not know which alliance Cali's in. Inside the vault, Buckwild, 20 Pack, and Bonez are voted into the box. On the Power Outing, a chef cooks a newly caught fish for the contestants. Angelique has to look away, since she is a vegetarian. Before eating lunch, Angelique asks to talk to 20 Pack. Angelique then flashes 20 Pack, and 20 Pack says in his interview that she's too much for him and says if she gives him a chance to get drunk, he'd be most likely to "doink" her. On the one on one time, Angelique picks Bonez. Bonez tells Angelique if she keeps him, he'll welcome her to his alliance. Angelique says she does not know if she can trust Bonez. Back at the house, Angelique tells Buckwild that Bonez told her Cali is in Bonez' alliance, and Buckwild tells Saaphyri and Saaphyri confronts Cali and Cali denies it and says she is in their alliance, admitting that she does not think her loyalty with Prancer will last to the end. At elimination, Angelique gives the first check to 20 Pack, but will only give it to him, if he kisses her. 20 Pack at first declines, not wanting the same result from I Love New York 2 to happen again, but eventually does and he gets his check. Angelique then calls up Buckwild and admits she knows she can trust her, but thinks she is a strong player, but eventually hands her the check. Buckwild thanks Angelique by kissing her butt. Angelique apologizes to Bonez, saying it was not personal, but he did not do enough to prove himself loyal to Angelique. Bonez says in his interview that all things happen for a reason.

- Challenge: Fire and Ice
- Winner: Green Team
- Loser: Gold Team
- Pay Master: Angelique
- Bottom 3: 20 Pack, Bonez, Buckwild
- Eliminated: Bonez

Reason For Elimination

- **Bonez** - Bonez did not prove himself as loyal to Angelique.

=== Episode 8: How Do You Say 'Implosion' in Spanish ===
First aired March 23, 2009

As the episode opens, we see Saaphyri and It sleeping in bed the next morning, hinting that there may be a relationship blossoming between them. Craig notes the next challenge will be involving a "drop." On the Gold Team, Tailor Made is picked captain, while Saaphyri is picked for the Green Team. The Green and Gold teams then face off in their most hair-raising challenge yet--"Tangle Web of Lies", where the contestants learn they will be disentangling themselves from a series of elevated ropes and plunging into the sea beneath them. The challenge is based on the contestants lying on the shows. Entertainer then wonders whether his fate from last season's I Love Money will happen again. Each team member will have to participate, three people will have to disentangle the rope, while the rest of the team members served as dead weights, then the disentangles will release their rope and drop in the water and swim to the life preserver in the fastest time possible. On the Green team, Saaphyri, The Entertainer, and Angelique were the disentangles, while Myammee, It, and Cali served as dead weights. The Green Team wastes no time and disentangles their rope and finish the challenge in six minutes. On the Gold Team, Tailor Made's rope breaks and falls in the water, leading everybody into thinking that is qualified as a disqualification. However, Craig explains that the rope broke and that he did not release the rope, meaning his team will re-do the challenge and finish the game in five minutes, carrying them to an easy victory over the Green Team. Later, Tailor Made's scheming pays off when he convinces It to join his alliance. It in turn convinces Saaphyri to betray The Entertainer in the vault. When The Entertainer learns of this, he begins arguing with Saaphyri, even going so far as to break wind noisily in her direction. Saaphyri is disgusted and outraged. Ultimately, the fractured Green team cannot come to a consensus in the Vault. As Paymaster, Tailor Made selects Frank, Saaphyri, and Angelique for a power outing. As the three contestants rock climb, it becomes clear that Angelique is more athletic than anyone had guessed, suggesting she may well be a potential threat down the road. Tailor Made later confides in his teammates that Saaphyri climbed as well as he did, though a flashback suggests that Tailor Made did not complete the task with as much grace or gusto as his female counterpart. On the power outing, nobody says anything, but then Saaphyri and Entertainer argue. On the one on one time, Tailor Made picks The Entertainer. The Entertainer pleads with Tailor Made to save him, promising to join his alliance, and that Saaphyri isn't trustworthy. At eliminations, Tailor saves Frenchy first, commenting that he respects her for the strong loyalties she has shown to her alliance in the past. The Entertainer is called out next, but his check is promptly declared void. The Entertainer thinks ruefully about returning to his mother's basement, and clips of his unhappy home life are edited into his exit. Saaphyri receives her check and promises not to call Tailor Made a "devil" anymore; for his part, he promises not to call her a bitch. Buckwild concludes the episode by passionately kissing Frank and promising to eliminate Tailor Made for him in the future. However, Craig declares that from now on, there will be no more teams, endangering Buckwild's previous strategy of throwing challenges to please her allies.

- Challenge: Tangle Web of Lies
- Winner: Gold Team
- Loser: Green Team
- Paymaster: Tailor Made
- Bottom 3: Angelique, The Entertainer, Saaphyri
- Eliminated: The Entertainer

Reason For Elimination

- **The Entertainer** - Even though The Entertainer offered to help Tailor Made, he already had an alliance and eliminates him for being the strongest player and a big threat to his alliance.

=== Episode 9: Thrown Under the Bus ===
First aired March 30, 2009

Craig notes that the next challenge will be about "missing the bus." When the contestants arrive at the challenge site, they see a bunch or mannequins' backs turned to them. Craig says the challenge is called "Under the Bus" which is based on events on the reality shows when some of the contestants threw their friends under the bus. The rules of the challenge is each player must run and grab a mannequin with a shirt that represents a contestant, and throw it in the road in the target zone where a passing bus will run over it. Each player gets two chances, and if they missed the target zone, or grabs a decoy dummy, they will lose a mannequin. The first contestant to lose both mannequins will automatically be placed into the box. The last person standing will be Paymaster. 20 Pack goes first and grabs Tailor Made's dummy, but does not make it on time, giving 20 Pack one strike. It goes next, but has trouble seeing and can not find Cali's dummy, but grabs her dummy. However, he misses the target zone, and it was not Cali's dummy—it was Myammee's. It has one strike. Tailor Made successfully throws Cali's dummy in the target zone, and the bus runs over it, giving Cali a strike. Buckwild tries to find Tailor Made's mannequin, but ends up grabbing a random mannequin and misses the bus, but it was not Tailor Made's dummy—it was Craig, a decoy mannequin. Buckwild gets a strike. Myammee throws 20 Pack's dummy, but misses the target zone, leaving her with a strike. On Cali's turn, she aims for Myammee's dummy, but she misses the target zone, putting Cali in the box. In the end, it comes down to Prancer and Tailor Made, with Tailor Made winning, becoming the first back-to-back Paymaster this season (Hoopz was the first back-to-back Paymaster on Season 1).

Name	1	2	3	4
Tailor Made	**Cali**	**Angelique**	**Ice**	**Prancer**
Prancer	**It**	Tailor Made	**Tailor Made**	-
Ice	**20 Pack**	**Angelique**	Tailor Made	
Angelique	**Myammee**	-		
Saaphyri	It	Prancer		
Buckwild	Craig^{2}	Prancer		
Myammee	20 Pack			
20 Pack	Tailor Made			
It	Myammee^{1}			
Cali	Myammee			

The contestant made an unsuccessful launch and lost one of their dummies.

- ^{1} It believed he was throwing Cali's dummy under the bus, but it was revealed he grabbed Myammee's instead.
- ^{2} Buckwild grabbed a decoy dummy with Craig's face that counted as an automatic miss. Names in bold mean that they were successfully thrown under the bus.

At the house, Tailor Made talks to Cali and asks her not to vote for anybody in the vault, and he'll in return not void her check. In the vault, Cali votes with her alliance Myammee and It in the box. On the power outing, the contestants play tennis. It keeps bragging to Cali that she is going home and makes funny faces at her. At lunch, Cali struggles to plea her case. On the one on one time, Tailor Made picks Cali and Cali tells him if he saves her, she'll save him the next time. At elimination, Tailor gives Myammee the first check. Tailor Made tells Cali he will not be voiding her check, Prancer will be instead. Prancer explains that she saved Cali the first time and if she would have listened to her after saving her the first time, then she would be safe. Then Prancer voids her check. It sings a song for Cali's departure.

- Challenge: Under the Bus
- Winner/Paymaster: Tailor Made
- Loser: Cali
- Bottom 3: Cali, It, Myammee
- Eliminated: Cali

Reason For Elimination

- **Cali** - Prancer saved Cali and told her to do what she had to do to save herself. Instead, Cali betrayed Prancer and her alliance, which led to Tailor Made giving Prancer the opportunity to void Cali's check, making her the very first contestant to void a person's check instead of Craig.

=== Episode 10: You Made Your Bed, Now Lie in It ===
First aired April 6, 2009

The new challenge is called "Bed Hopping", which is based on bedroom affairs from various vh1 shows. Each contestant must hop from bed to bed and grab a bag of money and run back to land and put it in a trunk and go back and retrieve a second bag of money and put in the trunk in the fastest time possible, under five minutes. If somebody falls from the bed into the water, they have to go back to the starting point and start over. Buckwild goes first and finishes in 2:32. Myammee goes next and finishes in 1:45, and then Ice goes and finishes 1:43. Prancer then takes the lead with 1:40. 20 Pack goes next and finishes the challenge very fast in 26 seconds. Tailor Made struggles with his part and finishes 2:37, putting him in last place. Saaphyri also struggles and falls off the bed and has to go back to start, finishing in 2:51. It also does very bad and falls in the water and finishes in 4:47. Angelique falls in the water twice and does not even try to finish on the second time, making her disqualified, leaving her in last place, making 20 Pack the Paymaster.

Rank	Name	Time
1	20 Pack	0:26
2	Prancer	1:40
3	Ice	1:43
4	Myammee	1:45
5	Buckwild	2:32
6	Tailor Made	2:37
7	Saaphyri	2:51
8	It	4:47
9	Angelique	Disqualified

The contestant lost the competition.
The contestant won the competition, and was the paymaster.
The contestant was disqualified.

Back at the house, Tailor Made gets medically treated for his toe. Saaphyri and Buckwild realize with Frenchy in the box, they're outnumbered by Tailor Made's alliance, meaning one of them in their alliance will be voted into the box. Saaphyri tries to convince It to vote somebody in his alliance into the box, but It says no. Saaphyri then throws It is stuff in the yard. 20 Pack tries to per sway Tailor Made to put It in the box, but Tailor Made refuses. In the vault Saaphyri and Buckwild try to stall, but do not succeed. In desperation, Buckwild throws her water at Myammee and Myammee grabs Buckwild's face, but the producer separates them. Craig calms down the vault and decides they're gonna vote and he is gonna do it in a calm way. Buckwild and Saaphyri panic, so Saaphyri falls to the floor. Nobody believes it. Buckwild then says Saaphyri is sick. It and Tailor Made begin to wonder if Saaphyri really is sick, so then It holds Saaphyri's feet in the air. Buckwild takes Saaphyri to her room and tells her to pass out on the bed. A medic arrives and applies an oxygen mask on her and is about to insert a needle in her, but Saaphyri then comes out of it and the two return to the vault. The voting then resumes and Saaphyri and Buckwild are voted into the box. On the power outing, Saaphyri says 20 Pack should save her since she saved him once, and should save Buckwild because they're friends. Angelique admits 20 Pack owes her because she also saved him awhile back. On the one on one time, 20 Pack decides to talk to both Buckwild and Saaphyri. They both say they're stronger and smarter than Frenchy and he should keep them. Back at the house, Tailor Made approaches 20 Pack and says if he gets rid of Buckwild, they will not vote for him next time in the vault. At elimination, 20 Packs admits to not wanting to be Paymaster because he does not want to pick off anybody from his alliance. 20 Pack calls up Buckwild and hugs her, but then voids her check. Saaphyri then vows to get 20 Pack out of the house.

- Challenge: Bed Hopping
- Winner/Paymaster: 20 Pack
- Loser: Angelique
- Bottom 3: Angelique, Buckwild, Saaphyri
- Eliminated: Buckwild

Reason For Elimination

- **Buckwild** - 20 Pack did not want to separate Saaphyri and Buckwild, while he owed Angelique for saving him in a past elimination, but he eliminated Buckwild because Tailor Made and his majority alliance made a deal with him that if he does so, they'll save him next time he is up for elimination.

=== Episode 11: You Can Scream All You Want ===
First aired April 13, 2009

Picking up where Episode 10 left off, Saaphyri wants 20 Pack out of the house. 20 Pack explains he kept her in because she has always looked out for him, so he wanted to return the favor. The next day, Saaphyri asks Myammee why she always has to wear lingerie at every elimination and the two fight and Myammee states her opinion that she can wear lingerie because women the size of Saaphyri should only wear sleepwear. The new challenge is called "Loud Mouth" which is based on past contestants screaming. Two people will compete at a time, and must scream at a level of at least 100 dB and hold it for as long as possible. Whichever one in each competition pair is the first to drop below 100 dB will fall under a trap door and lose. Whoever loses with the shortest time at the end of the first round of the competition is the Dead Last Loser. 20 Pack and Myammee compete first. 20 Pack decides based on the bad turn of events he had to face in the last challenge when he was Paymaster that again this is the one time he does not want Paymaster, so 20 Pack tries throwing the challenge so somebody else in his alliance might win. He does this by intentionally dropping below 100 dB first. 20 Pack then falls through the door with a time of 11.4 seconds. Ice and Tailor Made compete next, and Ice wins. Angelique and It compete next, and everybody notices it is level start to drop, but are surprised when Angelique gives out first and drop so It wins. Saaphyri and Prancer compete next, and Saaphyri is determined to be Paymaster so she gives it her all. Prancer is not holding out as well as she thought, so she gives out and prepares to fall through the trap door, but is surprised to find Saaphyri barely gave out a split second before she did, and so Prancer wins. With the first round of the competition complete, the person with the shortest time is 20 Pack, so he is declared the Dead Last Loser, from first to worst. 20 Pack is not worried. We move to the next round, the Semi-Finals. First Prancer and Myammee compete. Prancer is determined to see Myammee's weave get wet, so she gives it her all, but falls short and falls down. Myammee celebrates her win with a little dance on the trap door, to Craig's amusement. It and Ice then compete and It falls instantly, because he could not get his voice above 100 dB for more than a second this time. Ice wins. It is saving grace from being the Dead Last Loser because of this short a time is because this is not the first round. Now it is time for the third round, the Finals. It is down to Ice and Myammee to shout it out for Paymaster, and like Prancer, Ice wants Myammee wet so she gives it everything she has..and again like Prancer, Ice falls short and gets wet. Myammee wins the game and dances on her trap door again as she is declared Paymaster. 20 Pack is the Dead Last Loser.

Quarter-finals
**20 Pack**	Lose
**Myammee**	Win
**Prancer**	Win
**Saaphyri**	Lose
**Ice**	Win
**Tailor Made**	Lose
**Angelique**	Lose
**It**	Win

Semi-finals
**Myammee**	Win
**Prancer**	Lose
**Ice**	Win
**It**	Lose

Final
**Ice**	Lose
**Myammee**	Win

Back at the house, It suggests that Myammee should go back on her deal that her alliance with saving 20 Pack. Tailor Made, however, wants to continue to keep their end of the bargain. Tailor Made then warns 20 Pack he isn't as safe as he thinks, but his signals seem more mixed when he reassures him "You're good...you're good". Saaphyri eavesdrops into their conversation and she confronts 20 Pack and calls him a "little bitch" and says everybody wants him to go home. Saaphyri talks to Angelique and tries to convince her to form an all-girl alliance. Myammee, on the other hand, plans on starting her own alliance with Ice and Prancer, The PGA (Pretty Girl Alliance). In the vault, Saaphyri gives a speech saying all the girls should band together, but she fails, and she and Angelique are voted into the box. Saaphyri then announces she's quitting the game. Before Craig voids her check, he wants to know if she's sure. Saaphyri then asks It if she should quit, and It says "No...you might not go home...she might send Frenchy home!". He then continues to mumble on about other things, to everyone's amusement. So Saaphyri changes her mind and stays in the game. On the power outing, the contestants get massages. During the massage, 20 Pack falls asleep and doesn't bother pleading his case. At lunch, Myammee wonders why Saaphyri hasn't said much and Saaphyri says she isn't gonna "kiss Myammee ass." At elimination, Myammee calls up 20 Pack and then voids his check. 20 Pack says in his interview he knew he shouldn't have trusted Tailor Made's alliance. 20 Pack takes his voided check and leaves, glaring at Tailor Made, not knowing how livid and embarrassed Tailor Made is that his agreement was not kept. Tailor Made says in his interview that Myammee should have kept her word and spared 20 Pack. When Myammee calls Saaphyri up for her check, Myammee refuses to just give it to her even after having voided 20 Pack's check, saying she could beat her, kill her, murder her in any competition, to which Saaphyri answers "You never know" each time. Saaphyri ends up having to forcefully take her check from Craig's hands. Craig protests at first but then lets her join the others with her check. Saaphyri's resolve against Myammee is even stronger now.

- Challenge: Loud Mouth
- Winner/Paymaster: Myammee
- Loser: 20 Pack
- Bottom 3: 20 Pack, Angelique, Saaphyri
- Eliminated: 20 Pack

Reason For Elimination

- **20 Pack** - Myammee went against Tailor Made's deal with 20 Pack and decided to eliminate 20 Pack in order to eliminate the biggest threat and secure her own protection.

=== Episode 12: Can You Hang? ===
First aired April 20, 2009

After Myammee went against the alliance by getting rid of 20 Pack, Tailor Made feels she's turned on him. Ice and Prancer then agree that there is no alliance anymore. The next day, Craig hints the next challenge will test the contestants how they'll "hang on". Everyone believes that it might be the stripper pole challenge from last season. Prancer worries because she thinks Angelique might do good with this challenge. While Myammee and It practice "hanging on", Saaphyri tells Angelique she's onto the PGA. When they arrive at the challenge site, instead of seeing stripper poles, the contestants instead see suspending life preservers. The name of the challenge is called "Hang On Flav", which is based on Flavor of Love when Flav was on his boating date with New York, he was hanging onto the lifeboat. Each contestant has to hang onto the preserver as long as they can and whoever falls into the water first, unlike last year, will be the Dead Last Loser and be put in the box, and whoever lasts the longest will be Paymaster. Myammee hesitates at first to jump in the water because she doesn't want to damage her weave, but eventually jumps in and swims to a preserver. When everybody's hoisted up, everybody has their legs through the hole of the preserver, except for It. It then falls and lands in the water, making him come in last place. Soon, Ice falls as she can't hold anymore, then Myammee falls as she isn't in a comfortable position. Angelique's arms get tired and hangs only by her legs then her feet accidentally slip out of buoy and she lands upside down, then Prancer hangs only by her legs. Prancer decides to let go and falls hard in the water and hurts her leg, leaving only Tailor Made and Saaphyri. Scared she may lose, Saaphyri then prays to God and hopes He can forgive all the times she's cussed out the "bitches". Tailor begins to lose his grip and warns Prancer, who's still in the water, to move because he does not want to fall on her. Tailor Made then falls into the water, making Saaphyri Paymaster.

Rank	Contestant	Time
1	Saaphyri	13:30
2	Tailor Made	13:14
3	Prancer	9:55
4	Angelique	5:33
5	Myammee	4:44
6	Ice	3:08
7	It	1:07

The contestant lost the competition.
The contestant was in last place, and their check was placed in the strong box.
The contestant won the competition, and was paymaster.

Prancer continues to whine about her injury but Saaphyri isn't too sure if she really is injured because she still remembers when Toastee faked an injury last season. Paramedics arrive and take Prancer to the hospital. Back at the house, Prancer's leg is bandaged up. Tailor Made and Myammee want to throw Prancer in the box. Ice talks to Frenchie and wants her to vote Tailor Made into the box. Angelique says no, because he saved her awhile back. Ice asks Saaphyri who she wants in the box and Saaphyri calls that a "dumb question"; Myammee. Ice then explains that her alliance wants Tailor Made in the box and Saaphyri then says in her interview that NOW the girls want the boys out, instead of yesterday. Saaphyri talks to Tailor Made and alerts him that the girls in his alliance are gunning for him, but Tailor wants proof, so he eavesdrops while Saaphyri talks to Ice and Prancer and they admit they want Tailor out. Saaphyri wants It to vote Myammee into the box, and It says no. Saaphyri then tells It to get out of her room. The very next morning, Myammee tells It to vote Prancer into the box, but It doesn't answer. Saaphyri then walks into the room and Myammee says she was in there to see if It thought if she had a chance of staying. It replies, "There's nothing I can do" and then Myammee leaves. In the vault, before they vote, with It already in the box for finishing dead last, Angelique explains to the majority alliance that if they vote her into the box with It, one of them still has to go in third and that's who Saaphyri will send home, since Angelique is in her alliance and she already knows it will be safe, so if two them go into the box with It, they'll have a better chance to survive elimination, which they agree with and Prancer and Ice end up getting the most votes. Ice then says the secret alliance is over. After the vault, Ice and Myammee hug and Myammee apologizes and Ice accepts. Prancer talks to Saaphyri and she tearfully tells her that she is done with Myammee and admits Myammee was disrespectful to Saaphyri last elimination. She also says when she is Paymaster again, she'll do anything to get rid of Tailor Made and Myammee. On the power outing, the four contestants sit and tan. Ice and Prancer argue who's stronger and Ice says she is faking her injury. Prancer explains that she has a contusion, which is a bruise on her bone. On the one on one time, Saaphyri talks to Ice. Ice kisses up to Saaphyri and admits she didn't know Saaphyri was so strong and promises to join her alliance. At elimination, Craig asks Myammee about how she put Ice and Prancer under the bus, and Myammee tearfully says it would have been suicide if she was voted into the box. Saaphyri calls up It to get his first check. Before giving him his check, Saaphyri asks It if he loves her, and he says he does, and then tells him to twirl. It twirls, and Saaphyri gives him the check. Saaphyri then calls up Prancer and hands her the check, and Prancer cries and hugs her. Saaphyri asks her if those are real tears, and Prancer says yes. Ice's check is voided, and Saaphyri tells her that not voting for Myammee was sabotaging herself and that was what sent her home. Myammme says in her interview that Saaphyri now has Prancer "under her boobs".

- Challenge: Hang On Flav
- Winner/Paymaster: Saaphyri
- Loser: It
- Bottom 3: Ice, It, Prancer
- Eliminated: Ice

Reason For Elimination

- **Ice** - Saaphyri eliminated Ice because she tried to save Myammee by putting herself in the box.

=== Episode 13: Big Boobs, Big Bucks ===
First aired April 27, 2009

The talking Craig picture notes the challenge is about "enhance", "reduce", and "bust". When the contestants arrive at the challenge site, Craig tells them the challenge is called, "Iron Boobs", which is based on past Vh1 contestants having fake boobs. Each contestant must wear giant inflatable boobs and run through an obstacle course consisting of hurdles, poles, a giant boob cut-out, a tire hop, a balance beam, swim around a buoy, and go back to the starting point in the shortest amount of time will be Paymaster, and the loser will automatically be put in the box. Myammee goes first and finishes in 1:58. Tailor Made goes next and finishes in 1:49. Prancer goes next and goes through the obstacle course very fast, but falls down after she finishes swimming and struggles to make it to the starting point. However, she takes the lead, finishing in 1:35. Saaphyri and It struggle in the challenge, while Angelique does well, until she walks on the tire hop instead of putting her feet in it, making her start over from there. In the end, Prancer wins the challenge and It had the lowest time, making him the dead-last loser.

Rank	Name	Time
1	Prancer	1:35
2	Angelique	1:44
3	Tailor Made	1:49
4	Myammee	1:58
5	Saaphyri	2:14
6	It	3:15

The contestant lost the competition.
The contestant was in last place, and their check was automatically placed in the strong box.
The contestant won the competition, and was the paymaster.

Myammee then begins to worry because Prancer and Saaphyri are in an alliance and that Prancer will send her home. Tailor Made convinces It to vote for Saaphyri. In the vault, Saaphyri and Frenchy are voted into the box. Angelique causes a stir and wants to quit because she does not trust Prancer. Saaphyri consoles her, and Angelique decides to stay. On the power outing, the contestants golf. At lunch, Saaphyri says Prancer should keep her because she saved her last time and she is not that strong. It says he should stay because he is weak. On the one on one time, Prancer picks Frenchy and Prancer wants to form an alliance with her, but Angelique does not trust her because she turned on their alliance. At elimination, Saaphyri gets the first check. Prancer then calls up Angelique and tells her she did not really get a chance to get to know her, but she is a bigger threat than It and voids her check. Angelique aks Prancer if she is afraid of a challenge, and Prancer says no, but she knows she can beat It.

- Challenge: Iron Boobs
- Winner/Paymaster: Prancer
- Loser: It
- Bottom 3: Angelique, It, Saaphyri
- Eliminated: Angelique

Reason For Elimination

- **Angelique** - Prancer saw Angelique as more of a threat than It or Saaphyri.

=== Episode 14: The Final Showdown ===
First aired May 4, 2009

The episode begins with the introduction of the first challenge, which is entitled Excess Baggage. For the challenge, each contestant must traverse a beam suspended above the ground, releasing bags attached to the beam. The winner of the competition would be made the Paymaster, while the check of the contestant with the slowest time would automatically voided. Myammee wins the competition with Prancer coming in a close second. Saaphyri had the slowest time, finishing ten seconds behind It. Saaphyri asks to void her check herself; a request which Craig grants.

Rank	Name	Time
1	Myammee	0:43
2	Prancer	0:46
3	Tailor Made	2:02
4	It	2:32
5	Saaphyri	2:43

The contestant lost the competition, but was not in last place.
The contestant was in last place, and their check was automatically voided.
The contestant won and was Paymaster.

At the power outing, It portrays himself as a weak competitor, while Prancer pointed out that It was perhaps not a trustworthy person. At the ceremony, Tailor Made is given the first check, after which, Myammee then calls up It. She tells him he isn't trustworthy but couldn't run, see, or swim so she gives him his check. Myammee tells Craig to void Prancer's check because Prancer is too strong and she is afraid that she could not beat Prancer. On the way to their last challenge, It reveals that his grandfather had died long before his birth, leading Myammee and Tailor Made to become upset that he had earlier lied about this fact. For the final challenge, It, Myammee, and Tailor Made compete in the "Dash for the Cash". To complete the challenge, they must navigate an obstacle course of past challenges (throwing coconuts into a basket, pumping up an inner-tube to float across water, melt ice to get a coin for the taxi, save a dummy from the water, and return to the mansion for a quiz). It starts strong on the coconut challenge but then gets lost in the jungle. Tailor Made is the first to arrive at the ice-melting stage, but Myammee, who arrives second, passes him, retrieving her coin before Tailor Made. At the dummy saving challenge, Tailor Made loses more time when he doesn't realize his dummy is tethered to a rope. Myammee is the first to arrive at the mansion, which she is given a choice between two trivia challenges. She chose questions from the category "Six Degrees Of Buckwild" rather than questions about the Entertainer. Myammee performs relatively well, correctly answering all but two questions. She is able to correct her answers just as Tailor Made arrives at the stage, winning the $250,000. Myammee falls to the ground in tears. Craig then promptly voids Tailor Made's and It's check. Tailor and Myammee hug. Meanwhile, It is far behind, melting the wrong side of the block of ice. He gives up on the challenge, orders shrimp, puts it on the ice, which makes it fall down on the ground.

- Challenge: Excess Baggage
- Winner/Pay Master: Myammee
- Loser/Eliminated: Saaphyri
- Bottom 3: It, Prancer, Tailor Made
- Eliminated: Prancer
- Final Challenge: Dash For The Cash
- Runner-Ups: Tailor Made, It
- Winner: Myammee

Reason For Elimination

- **Saaphyri** - Came in last place in the challenge. She volunteered to void her own check, making her the 2nd person to void a check instead of Craig.
- **Prancer** - Myammee saw Prancer as a stronger player and a bigger threat to her.
- **It** - Finished in 3rd Place in the Dash for the Cash.
- **Tailor Made** - Finished as the Runner-Up in the Dash for the Cash.

=== Episode 15: Reunion Show ===
First aired May 10, 2009

Almost all of the cast (except Saaphyri and Tamara) reunite. Angelique is the first to be called on stage. She and Craig discuss her being underrated by the other contestants, and she says she is athletic thanks to stripping. She then verbally fights with Prancer over whether or not it was karma that prevented the latter to win and mocks her for her "$500 boob-job" and "10-year-old turtle" look. 20 Pack is then brought on stage and both reveal that they are dating other people when Craig asks Angelique if she wants another chance with 20. Up next is Leilene, brought on stage with Buddha and Heat. They both tell her she must love herself before loving others, of which Buckwild agrees. Heat then explains he got upset when Leilene said she was not mentally attracted to him because he felt she called him an idiot and a montage of his drunken and stupid moments are shown. Leilene then admits to being mentally attracted to him. Entertainer is then brought on stage with Heat and they discuss him getting rid of Heat twice, Heat says he has no hard feelings but thought 20 Pack would have bounced instead of him. Frank then says he should get his own show, getting a lot of cheers, Heat does too, planning to have his mother and his ya-ya (grandmother) as chaperones to the girls. It is then brought on stage and reiterates that his dumbness was all an act, of which Ice disagrees. It then shows how "analystical" he is by moonwalking. Tailor Made joins him on stage and after discussing their alliance (which Buckwild dubs "the ones nobody remembers from the show"), reveals himself and It are running for New York City Council, after learning to use their differences to their advantage. It advises the Jews and Muslims do the same ("have beards together and not eat pork together"), and the duo offer a preview of their YouTube series. Finally, Myammee is brought on stage and offers a different explanation for her lingerie wearing, saying she lost her suitcase. She then says she will use the money to provide for her aunt and her father. She also reveals her intention to help women changing their weaves as often as she does, which makes some castmembers laugh.

- Contestants Who **Did** Attend: 20 Pack, Angelique, Bonez, Buckwild, Buddha, Cali, The Entertainer, Heat, Ice, It, Leilene, Milf, Myammee, Onyx, Prancer, Tailor Made, T-Weed
- Contestants Who **Did Not** Attend: Saaphyri, Tamara

== After the show ==
- Saaphyri Windsor was in jail during the airing of I Love Money 2 and the reunion show. She was released from jail in August 2010.
- The Entertainer (Frank Maresca) starred in Frank the Entertainer in a Basement Affair, which premiered on January 3, 2010, on VH1.
- T-Weed (Kevin Watson) has been accused of allegedly committing several cases of fraud.
- 20 Pack appeared on the fourth season of I Love Money.
