= Charm School (TV series) =

- Created by: Cris Abrego; Mark Cronin
- Country of origin: United States
- Original language: English
- No. of seasons: 3
- No. of episodes: 34

Production
- Executive producers: Mark Cronin; Cris Abrego; Ben Samek
- Running time: 60 minutes (including commercials)
- Production company: 51 Minds Entertainment

Original release
- Network: VH1
- Release: April 15, 2007 – July 27, 2009

Related
- Flavor of Love; Rock of Love; Real Chance of Love; I Love Money

Charm School is a reality television series airing on VH1; it is a spin-off of Flavor of Love created by executive producers Cris Abrego and Mark Cronin. The first season, called Flavor of Love Girls: Charm School, is hosted by comedian Mo'Nique and features thirteen contestants from the first two seasons of Flavor of Love. The second season, called Rock of Love: Charm School, is hosted by Sharon Osbourne and features fourteen contestants from the first two seasons of Rock of Love with Bret Michaels. The third season, called Charm School with Ricki Lake, is hosted by Ricki Lake and features contestants from Rock of Love Bus with Bret Michaels and Real Chance of Love. The show ostensibly acts as a finishing school for its contestants that helps develop proper etiquette. Season 1 offered a prize of $50,000, while Seasons 2 and 3 doubled the amount to $100,000. All three seasons offered the title of "Charm School Queen."

== Series overview ==
Seasons of Charm School
Season	Headmistress	Season premiere	Finale	Reunion	No. of contestants	No. of episodes	Winner	Runner(s)-up
Season 1	Mo'Nique	April 15, 2007 (5.07M viewers)	July 1, 2007 (4.1M viewers)	July 8, 2007	13	11	Saaphyri Windsor	Leilene "Smiley" Ondrade
Season 2	Sharon Osbourne	October 12, 2008 (2.4M viewers)	December 21, 2008 (2.1M viewers)	January 4, 2009	14	12	Brandi Mahon	Destiney Sue Moore
Season 3	Ricki Lake	May 11, 2009	July 27, 2009 (2.1M viewers)	None	14	11	Ebony "Risky" Jones	Ashley and Marcia

=== Flavor of Love Girls: Charm School ===
Flavor of Love Girls: Charm School was hosted by comedian Mo'Nique and featured 13 contestants from the first two seasons of Flavor of Love, who were assigned the challenge of developing proper etiquette in a competition for $50,000 and the title of "Charm School Queen." Mo'Nique was assisted by talent agency president Keith Lewis and magazine beauty director Mikki Taylor. The series first aired weekly from April 15, 2007 to July 8, 2007. Saaphyri was ultimately named "Charm School Queen" and was awarded the $50,000.

=== Rock of Love: Charm School ===
Rock of Love: Charm School was hosted by Sharon Osbourne and featured 14 contestants from the first two seasons of Rock of Love, who were assigned the challenge of developing proper etiquette in a competition for $100,000 and the title of "Charm School Queen." The series premiered on October 12, 2008, and the finale was aired on December 21, 2008. Brandi Mahon was ultimately named "Charm School Queen" and was awarded the $100,000.

=== Charm School with Ricki Lake ===
Charm School with Ricki Lake is hosted by Ricki Lake and features 14 contestants from Rock of Love Bus with Bret Michaels and Real Chance of Love, who learn self-improvement through selfless acts and charity work. The headmistress, Ricki Lake, is assisted by deans Alani "La La" Vazquez and Stryker. The series premiered on May 11, 2009, and the finale was aired on July 27, 2009. Ebony "Risky" Jones was ultimately named "Charm School Queen" and was awarded the $100,000.

== DVD releases ==
Season 2 (Rock of Love: Charm School) was released in Australia by Shock Records in November 2010.

Season	Release dates	Discs
Season	Region 0	Discs
2	10 November 2010	3
