= Rock of Love with Bret Michaels =

American reality television dating game show

- Created by: Cris Abrego; Mark Cronin
- Starring: Bret Michaels
- Opening theme: "Go That Far" by Bret Michaels
- Country of origin: United States
- No. of seasons: 3
- No. of episodes: 40

Production
- Executive producers: Cris Abrego; Mark Cronin; Ben Samek
- Running time: 60 minutes (including commercials); 30 minutes (season recap)
- Production company: 51 Minds Entertainment

Original release
- Network: VH1
- Release: July 15, 2007 – April 19, 2009

Related
- Rock of Love: Charm School; Charm School with Ricki Lake; Daisy of Love; Megan Wants a Millionaire; Bret Michaels: Life as I Know It

Rock of Love with Bret Michaels is an American reality television dating game show. It stars Bret Michaels, the lead singer from the band Poison. The show closely resembles the show Flavor of Love. The first season featured 25 women competing to be Michaels' girlfriend. Each week, the women face challenges, the winner of which gets to go on a date with Michaels. Some of the challenges were based on situations that they might encounter if chosen to be Michaels' girlfriend. The first season winner was 24-year-old Jes Rickleff from Naperville, Illinois. At the reunion, she revealed that she did not have romantic feelings for Michaels, and that she thought that he should have chosen the runner-up, Heather.

The second season featured another set of 20 women. This time around, Michaels chose 37-year-old Ambre Lake from Los Angeles, California. After the show, the two maintained a relationship, but parted ways after just a few months.

The third season premiered on January 4, 2009. The season finale was a series high for VH1, and Michaels chose Penthouse Pet Taya Parker as the winner.

A fourth season was offered to Michaels, but it was announced in May 2010 that he would be appearing in a new show entitled Bret Michaels: Life as I Know It, based around his everyday life.

== Seasons ==
Season	Season premiere	Season finale	Reunion show	Winner	Runner up	Number of Contestants	Number of Episodes
Season 1	July 15, 2007 (1.6M viewers)	September 30, 2007 (5.4M viewers)	October 7, 2007 (3.9M viewers)	Jes Rickleff	Heather Chadwell	25^{a}	13
Season 2	January 13, 2008 (3.72M viewers)	April 13, 2008 (5.03M viewers)	April 20, 2008 (3.15M viewers)	Ambre Lake	Daisy de la Hoya	20	14
Season 3	January 4, 2009 (2.1M viewers)	April 12, 2009 (3.2M viewers)	April 19, 2009	Taya Parker	Mindy Hall	23^{b}	13

- ^{a}There were 25 contestants, but 5 got eliminated before they entered the house. One of the five talked Big John into giving her another chance.
- ^{b}There were 20 contestants at the beginning of the season, but later 3 new girls were added.

== Production and legal problems ==
In April 2008 a breach-of-contract lawsuit was filed against both Michaels and the show's producers by the owner of the mansion, Ray Sahranavard. He claimed that about $380,000 worth of damage was done to the mansion, and that the producers failed to get insurance they had promised to buy for the house. Sahranavard said there were multiple holes in the walls and ceilings, the doors had been removed, that almost the entire interior had been repainted, and that most of the landscaping was dead or dying.

A crew member from 51 Minds Entertainment was involved in an auto accident on Interstate 57 in southern Illinois during production of Rock of Love Bus. The crew member, who is not an associate of Michaels or part of his tour staff, was traveling alone to the next location for the series. The accident resulted in two fatalities in one car and injuries to two passengers in another vehicle. The crew member survived and was released from the hospital.

== Contestants ==
- Ambre Lake: Winner of Rock of Love 2. She appeared in the 2002 film Sweet Home Alabama as a wedding planner, and starred in Tangled Web and Witch Hunters. She was also a featured fitness model on the Timekeeper Willis Boot Camp DVD. Lake made a guest appearance on the third season of Rock of Love along with Heather Chadwell as Bret's friends.
- Angelique Morgan: Morgan, also known as "Frenchy", from Rock of Love 2 also appeared on Rock of Love: Charm School, placing 12th, and I Love Money 2, placing sixth.
- Ashley "A-Bomb" Klarich: A contestant on Rock of Love Bus, placing fifth. On the third season of Charm School with Ricki Lake she was one of the two runners-up.
- Aubry Fisher: A contestant on Rock of Love 2 but Bret revealed the last pass after she decided to withdraw from the competition even though she was about to be eliminated. She later appeared on the third and fourth seasons of LA Ink.
- Beverly Palmer: A contestant Rock of Love Bus, where she placed fourth. She appeared on the third season of Charm School, but was disqualified on the first episode for physical violence with another cast member.
- Brandi "Hambone" Cunningham: Appeared on the first season of Rock of Love. She has modeled alongside Megan Hauserman, Kristy Joe Muller, and Destiney Sue Moore in a Guitar World photoshoot. She later went on to do pornography using the stage name Brittany Burke. She also appeared on I Love Money and Rock of Love: Charm School, placing 7th on both.
- Brandi Mahon: Placed fourth on the first season of Rock of Love. She was the winner of Rock of Love: Charm School. She previously did pornography using the name Pamela.
- Brittaney Starr: Starr, from Rock of Love Bus, is a singer/songwriter and porn star. She appeared on the third season of Charm School, and was expelled in Episode 4, placing ninth.
- Brittanya O'Campo: O'Campo was in the final six on Rock of Love Bus. A contestant on the third season of Charm School, she was expelled in episode 9, placing fourth. She also appeared on I Love Money 4, placing sixth.
- Cindy "Rodeo" Steedle: A single mother who was one of the two contestants eliminated in the fourth episode of Rock of Love. She later made a guest appearance on Rock of Love 2 in one of the challenges and also appeared as a contestant on I Love Money and Rock of Love: Charm School, finishing in 11th place on both shows.
- Courtney Van Dusen: One of the first contestants to be eliminated on Rock of Love 2 and later one of the first to be expelled on Rock of Love: Charm School.
- Daisy de la Hoya: The runner-up of Rock of Love 2. She claimed to be the niece of boxer Oscar De La Hoya in Episode 10. In a VH1 Extra video posted on VH1's web site, Jessica and Megan discover that the name Vanessa Mossman is printed on the checked-luggage tag attached to her luggage, causing them to suspect that is actually her real name. She has her own reality dating show called Daisy of Love.
- Dallas Harrison: Appeared on Rock of Love, eliminated in the third episode of the show. She later appeared on Rock of Love: Charm School, where she came in eighth. In 2009 she appeared in a Wendy's commercial. Harrison also appeared in a late night ExtaMax commercial.
- Destiney Moore: Placed third on Rock of Love 2. Moore has worked as an actress. She has modeled alongside Megan Hauserman, Kristy Joe Muller, and Brandi Cunningham in a Guitar World photoshoot. She also appeared on I Love Money, placing 13th, and was the runner-up on Rock of Love: Charm School.
- Farrah Sinclair: Appeared on Rock of Love Bus, where she made it to the final 7. She was later cast on Charm School, where she quit in the third episode because she could not get along with some of her castmates.
- Gia Lynn: Appeared on Rock of Love Bus, where she was one of the five first contestants to be sent home. Lynn was later cast on Charm School. She placed 13th, the second to be expelled. She also was believed to be a reserve on the canceled third season of I Love Money.
- Heather Chadwell: Runner-up of season 1 of Rock of Love. Chadwell appeared in the second and third season of Rock of Love as Bret's friend. She also has appeared on Rock of Love: Charm School, placing fourth, I Love Money, placing ninth, and various countdown shows on VH1. Chadwell also made cameo appearances in TV shows such as Californication and on the fifth season of the It's Always Sunny in Philadelphia, where she played one of the models for Paddy's Pub brand merchandise. She was a contestant on Jerry Springer's dating show, Baggage where she chose to go on a date with bachelor number one, Jimmy.
- Inna Dimitrenko: Appeared on Rock of Love 2, where she made it to the final seven. She later joined Rock of Love: Charm School, finishing ninth.
- Jamie Ross: Appeared on Rock of Love Bus, placing third. Ross is American Idol singer Constantine Maroulis's personal assistant.
- Jessica Kinni: Placed fourth on Rock of Love 2. Kinni was later cast on Rock of Love: Charm School, coming in fifth after Sharon did a double elimination where she agreed with remaining girls by choosing her over Kristy Joe Muller on who should need Charm School the least.
- Kristy Joe Muller: Appeared on Rock of Love 2, placing sixth after quitting. Since Rock of Love 2, she was cast on Rock of Love: Charm School, where she again placed sixth before Sharon did a double elimination the night she also eliminated Kinni. She has also modeled for Playboy. and Guitar World alongside Megan Hauserman, Brandi Cunningham, and Destiney Sue Moore.
- Lacey Conner: Appeared on the first season of Rock of Love, finishing third. She is a member of the band Nocturne. She placed third on Rock of Love: Charm School and made guest appearances on the second season and third season of Rock of Love. Conner was a contestant on the canceled third season of I Love Money and is believed to have placed sixth.
- Magdalena Widz: Appeared on season 1 of Rock of Love. She is Polish.
- Marcia "Brazil" Alves: A contestant on Rock of Love Bus, where she was eliminated in the fourth episode, leaving her in 12th. She also was a contestant on the third season of Charm School with Ricki Lake, where she was one of the two runners-up, and in the fourth season of I Love Money, where she was eliminated on the fourth episode, placing 14th. Alves was also a contestant on the canceled third season of I Love Money. She is believed to have been eliminated in the first episode.
- Megan Hauserman: Appeared on Rock of Love 2, finishing fifth. Before the show, she was the winner on season 3 of Beauty and the Geek, and modeled as a Playboy Cybergirl. Since Rock of Love, Hauserman was cast on I Love Money, placing third after quitting in the finale, and Rock of Love: Charm School, placing 10th. She also modeled for a Guitar World photoshoot alongside Cunningham, Muller, and Moore. Hauserman had her own VH1 reality dating show, Megan Wants a Millionaire, but it was canceled on August 23, 2009, because of controversy surrounding one of the show's contestants, Ryan Jenkins.
- Mindy Hall: The runner-up of Rock of Love Bus. She was the winner of the fourth season of I Love Money. Her twin sister Cindy Hall was a contestant on Survivor: Guatemala.
- Natasha McCollum: A contestant on Rock of Love Bus. She was on the third season of Charm School and eliminated in Episode 5, leaving her in eighth place. She went on to do pornography under the name Scarlett Mei Dior.
- Nikki "DJ Lady Tribe" Shamdasani: Eliminated in the first episode of Rock of Love Bus, Shamdasani is a graffiti artist and DJ under the name Lady Tribe.
- Raven Masterson: Eliminated on the first episode of Rock of Love and soon cast on Rock of Love: Charm School, but quit in the first episode, saying she did not want to be there. She has done pornography using the name Fiona.
- Tamara Witmer: Appeared on season 1 of Rock of Love and is also a model. She was the first contestant eliminated on I Love Money 2. She was Playboy's Miss August 2005.
- Taya Parker: The winner of Rock of Love Bus. Parker was Penthouse Pet of the Year for 2009. She has also posed for Playboy on several of its websites

== Soundtrack ==
The theme song for the Rock of Love series is "Go That Far", which is the first single from the Bret Michaels album Rock My World, the soundtrack to the "Rock of Love" series. Rock My World is the fifth music album by Bret Michaels. This album is a greatest hits compilation featuring songs from his last two studio albums and also features three new tracks plus a remixed track. All the music heard during the Rock of Love series is on the album. The album charted at #40 on The Billboard 200, #4 on the Top Independent Albums, #4 on the Top Hard Rock Albums and #16 on the Top Rock Albums chart.

== DVD releases ==
Season 1 has been released in the US, but it is censored. All three seasons have been released uncensored in Australia by Shock Records. A Box Set containing all 3 seasons was released in 2011.

Season	Release dates		Discs
Season	Region 1	Region 0	Discs
1	April 8, 2008	November 1, 2008	3 (R1); 4 (R0)
2		March 14, 2009	4
3		September 8, 2010	4

== Spin-offs ==
- I Love Money features contestants from Rock of Love, I Love New York, Real Chance of Love, and Flavor of Love competing in different challenges for the ultimate prize of $250,000.
- Rock of Love: Charm School features contestants from the first two seasons of Rock of Love competing for the title of "Charm School Queen" and a cash prize of $100,000.
- Daisy of Love features Rock of Love 2 runner-up Daisy de la Hoya in her own dating show.
- Charm School with Ricki Lake features 14 contestants from Rock of Love Bus and season 1 of Real Chance of Love who learn self-improvement through selfless acts and charity work. The winner will be named "Charm School Queen" and win the cash prize of $100,000.
- Megan Wants a Millionaire features Megan Hauserman from Rock of Love 2 in her own dating show spin-off. The show premiered on August 2, 2009, but was canceled on August 23, 2009, due to controversy involving castmember Ryan Jenkins.
- Bret Michaels: Life As I Know It features Bret Michaels from Rock of Love in a new show spin-off. This show is going to be about Bret Michaels, his family, and his lifestyle.
- Rock of Love Girls: Where Are They Now followed up with several of the girls from the show, showing where their lives have taken them since the filming of the show. Those that appeared included Heather, Lacey, Rodeo, Brandi C., and Tamara from Rock of Love, Daisy, Destiney, Megan, Kristy Joe, and Angelique from Rock of Love 2, and Taya, Mindy, Ashley, Farrah, and Marcia from Rock of Love Bus.
- Heather and Lacey have both claimed that they were offered her own show, but that both were ultimately cancelled when VH1 suspended celebreality programming following the murder of Jasmine Fiore.

== After the show ==
- Brandi C, Rodeo, Heather, Megan, and Destiney appeared on the first season of I Love Money, finishing in 7th, 11th, 9th, 3rd, and 13th, respectively.
- Tamara and Angelique appeared on I Love Money 2, where Tamara was the first to be eliminated, and Angelique came in sixth place.
- Marcia and Lacey appeared on cancelled I Love Money 3 where Marcia was the first to be eliminated, and Lacey came in sixth.
- Marcia, Brittanya, and Mindy appeared on I Love Money 4. Marcia came in fourteenth, Brittanya in sixth, and Mindy ultimately won the competition.
- Megan starred on her own dating show called Megan Wants a Millionaire, with Brandi C.
- Rock of Love: Charm School featured girls from the first two seasons. Brandi M, Lacey, Heather, Brandi C, Dallas, Rodeo, Raven, Destiney, Jessica, Kristy Joe, Inna, Megan, Angelique and Courtney. Brandi M. was the winner.
- Charm School with Ricki Lake featured girls from Rock of Love Bus, and Real Chance of Love. Beverly, Gia, Farrah, Brittaney Starr, Natasha, Brittanya, Marcia, and Ashley were all contestants, but none won the competition.
- Erin Martin, who was eliminated during the second-season premiere of Rock of Love, competed on the second season of The Voice as a member of Cee Lo Green's team. Despite having won a battle round against fellow competitors the Shields Brothers, her vocal performance has been panned by fans and critics alike, as well as Voice coach Cee Lo Green himself. On April 10, 2012, she was eliminated along with teammate Tony Vincent.
- Angelique "Frenchy" Morgan appeared on Celebrity Big Brother 14 as a contestant, and became the 3rd housemate to be evicted.

== In pop culture ==
The show was parodied in a sketch on the February 23, 2008 episode of Saturday Night Live.

Michaels and the series were also parodied in the video for Eminem's "We Made You".

The show can be seen playing on a television in a scene in the 2008 film Step Brothers.

The show can be seen playing on a television in the third episode of the American reality competition television series Whodunnit?.

YouTuber Papa Meat has referenced the show several times on his YouTube channel before making a 2-hour video about season 1 on April 6, 2025, a 3-hour video about season 2 on October 12, 2025, and a 2-hour episode about season 3 on August 31, 2026.

== See also ==
- Who Wants to Marry a Multi-Millionaire? (2000)
- The Osbournes (2002)
- Flavor of Love (2006)
- Gene Simmons Family Jewels (2006)
- Age of Love (2007)
