= Megan Hauserman =

American model and TV personality (born 1981)

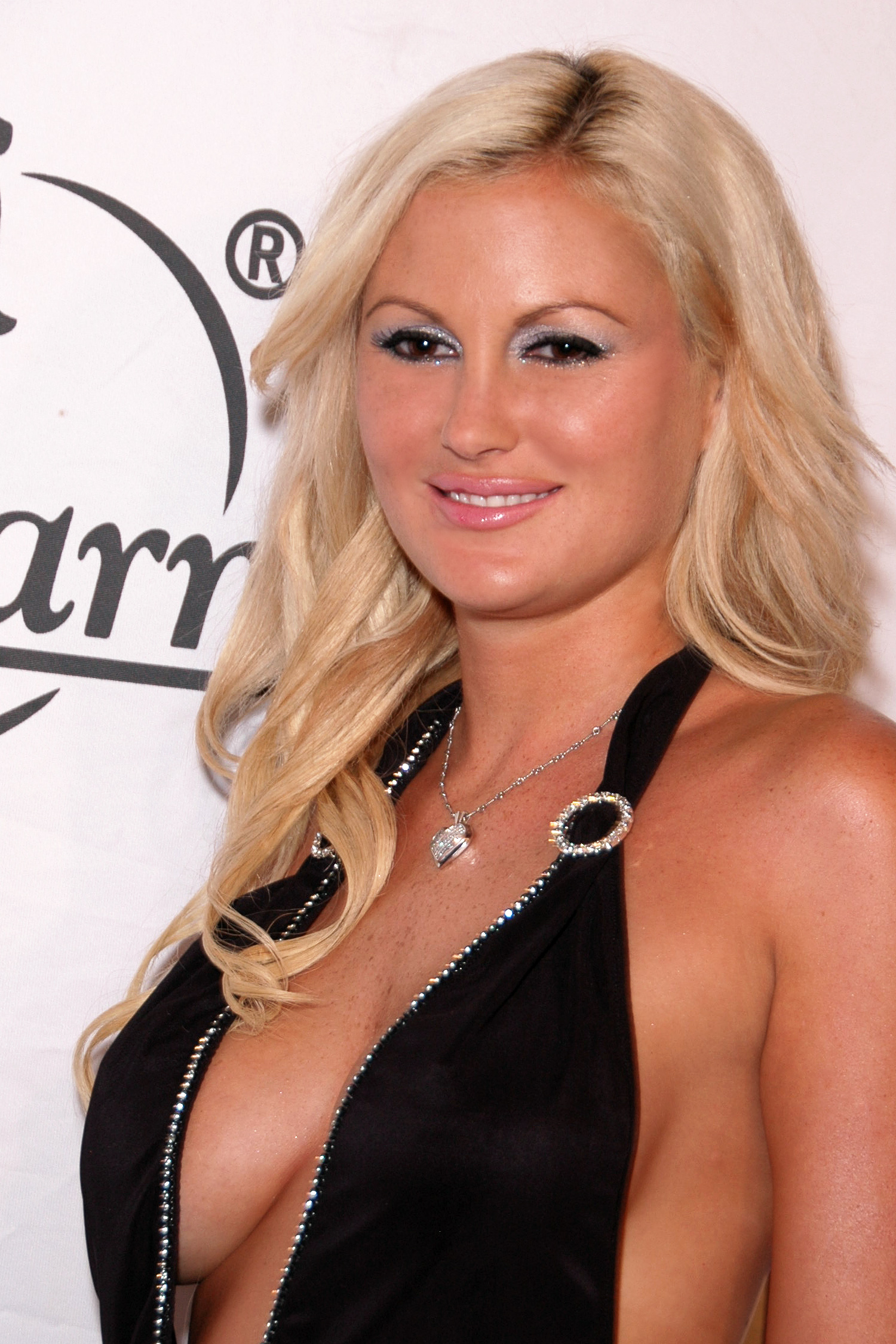
- Hauserman attending the Benchwarmer Sponsor in October 2007
- Born: November 5, 1981 (age 44); Boca Raton, Florida, U.S.
- Children: 1
- Modeling information
- Height: 5 ft 10 in (1.78 m)
- Hair color: Blonde (dyed); Brown (natural)
- Eye color: Brown
- Website: Official website

Megan Hauserman (born November 5, 1981) is an American model, reality television star and actress. She is best known for her appearances on the hit VH1 celebreality series, Rock of Love with Bret Michaels season 2, I Love Money season 1 and Rock of Love: Charm School.

After becoming one of the most recognizable characters from the franchise, Hauserman starred in her own short-lived, infamous dating show: Megan Wants a Millionaire.

== Early life ==
Hauserman was born November 5, 1981. She grew up in Forest Park, Illinois, and also spent some of her childhood in Chicago, Illinois.

== Modeling career ==
In the early 2000s, Hauserman began her modeling career as a holiday show model for the Jerry Springer Show, while attending college at the University of Illinois, in Chicago. She also posed for Benchwarmer Trading Cards regularly between 2005 and 2010.

In February 2006, Hauserman was featured as Playboy's cybergirl of the week. She posed nude for the Playboy website. Hauserman posed for Playboy a second time in 2007 for their Cybergirl Xtra series.

Hauserman posed for Guitar World Magazine's 2009 Holiday issue, alongside fellow Rock of Love contestants Brandi "Brandi C" Cunningham, Destiney Sue Moore and Kristy Jo Muller. In 2010 Hauserman was the cover girl, alongside Rock of Love contestant Daisy de la Hoya, for the Guitar World buyer's guide, special.

In 2013, Hauserman was the feature model for the Boca Raton based jewelry company Cerca Trova Fashion and led the campaign.

== Television career ==
Hauserman's first reality television appearance was as the winner on the third season of Beauty and the Geek alongside her partner Alan "Scooter" Zackheim. During her time on the show Hauserman became close friends with fellow contestant Cecille Gahr. Hauserman revealed that she would spend her half of the money by quote; "I'm going to go to Disneyland, and go on vacation, and get my hair done." However, during an interview in 2008, Hauserman revealed that she put all of her $125,000 winnings towards her mortgage.

In 2008, Hauserman appeared as a contestant on the second season of VH1's hit celebreality series Rock of Love with Bret Michaels. She claimed that she discovered the casting call for the show, from an advertisement listed on Craigslist. She placed fifth, featuring in ten episodes, as Michaels claimed he never felt a real connection with her. She was known for being sneaky and for feuding with fellow contestant Kristy Jo Muller. In an interview with The Jacksonville Observer she claimed she was heartbroken over Michaels for a long time, stating she truly did end up falling in love with him and that they still remained friends despite the show.

Hauserman then went on to be a contestant on the first season of the hit VH1 celebreality spin-off, I Love Money. The shows premise consisted of 17 former celebreality contestants from; Flavor of Love, I Love New York and Rock of Love competing in both mental and physical challenges for a $250,000 cash prize. Despite placing third, She formed an alliance with Brandi "Brandi C" Cunningham from Rock of Love with Bret Michaels season 1 and also had a short lived alliance with Flavor of Love season 1 star Brooke "Pumkin" Thompson and Flavor of Love season 2 star Jennifer "Toastee" Toof. Hauserman and Cunningham ended their alliance with Thompson and Toof, prompting a huge food fight which ended with security having to break the fight a part. Hauserman was responsible for the eliminations of; Lee "Mr Boston" Marks, Kamal "Chance" Givens, Cindy "Rodeo" Steedle, David "12 Pack" Amerman, Heather Chadwell, Jennifer "Toastee" Toof and Brooke "Pumkin" Thompson, despite only being the paymaster (the only player with the power to eliminate) once. Hauserman quit the competition in the season finale when it was revealed that she would have to face a jury of former contestants.

Hauserman went on to star in another VH1 celebreality spin-off, Rock of Love: Charm School. In which 14 former Rock of Love contestants competed for a $100,000 cash prize. The show was hosted by Sharon Osbourne, who acted as the official headmistress of Charm School. Hauserman continued her on screen alliance with Brandi "Brandi C" Cunningham and also teamed up with Rock of Love season 1 star Lacey Conner. She placed tenth, being expelled in the fourth episode after kicking Brandi "Brandi M" Mahon during an argument. During the Charm School reunion Hauserman would make derogatory comments about Sharon's career, prompting Charm School headmistress Sharon Osbourne to throw a drink in Hauserman's face and pull her hair. Hauserman filed a lawsuit against Osbourne, claiming battery, infliction of emotional distress and negligence. In 2011 the case was settled out of court with the official details kept non-disclose.

In 2009, Hauserman featured in a VH1 special titled The Great Debate. She appeared in all five episodes as a commentator giving her opinions on the debated subjects.

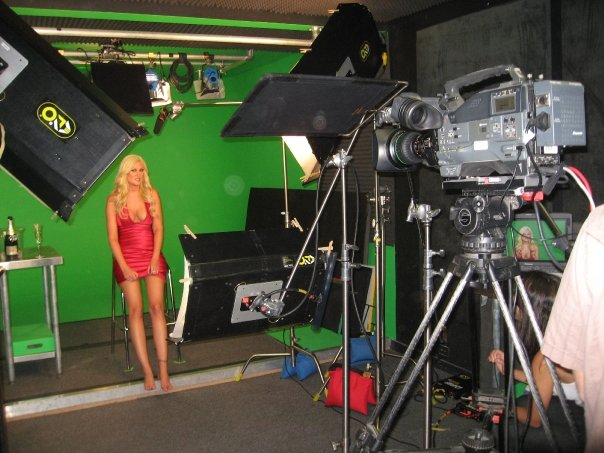
Hauserman filming interviews for VH1's Megan Wants a Millionaire

Hauserman then received her own VH1 celebreality dating show in 2009 titled; Megan Wants a Millionaire. The name stemming from her claiming on Charm School that her goal in life was to become a trophy wife. Megan Wants a Millionaire premiered August 2, 2009. In an interview Hauserman claimed she was looking for a mature guy that can handle her and does not cry, she was also wanting someone stable and she was taking the show very seriously. Hauserman's best friends Brandi "Brandi C" Cunningham, who appeared with Hauserman on I Love Money season 1 and Rock of Love: Charm School, and Cecille Gahr, who appeared with Hauserman on Beauty and the Geek season 3; made sporadic appearances to support her and help her with her decisions on the show. On August 24, 2009, VH1 announced that the show was officially cancelled after airing just three episodes. This was due to contestant Ryan Jenkins being a suspect in the murder of Jasmine Fiore. Jenkins, who had just filmed and won the unaired season of the VH1 spin-off I Love Money season 3, was charged with the murder of his wife Jasmine Fiore, whom he had met just two days after filming Megan Wants a Millionaire (from which Jenkins was eliminated, having placed third overall). The production company 51 Minds had to pay VH1 over $12 million in losses, and Jasmine Fiore's death would have a considerable effect on reality television. Hasuerman was interviewed by AOL and TMZ in an interview with People Magazine she claimed the situation was a very challenging and upsetting time, also claiming it was a sad and tragic situation that nobody could have expected. Hauserman featured on Nancy Grace and in 2011 she appeared on True Crime with Aphrodite Jones, with this being her first on air interview on the murder/suicide. Hauserman uploaded the three aired episodes to her official YouTube channel in 2020, alongside the never before seen episodes 4 and 5. In a 2020 interview with former Rock of Love season 1 contestant; Lacey Sculls, Hauserman stated she had genuinely fallen for Jenkins and wanted to choose him as the winner of the show, however, she was advised by production not to pick him if she wanted a second season of the show. Hauserman reached out to Jenkins after filming ended to find out that he had already met and began dating Fiore. In 2023, the Jenkins-Fiore case was covered in the true crime series The Playboy Murders.

Hauserman made sporadic appearances on television including in the 2009 television specials; Sexiest Women of Reality TV and Sexiest Women of Reality TV: Bikini Babes. In 2009, she appeared in a Truth.com anti-smoking commercial alongside her dog Lily. In 2010, she appeared in the Rock of Love Girls: Where Are They Now special, she also appeared on BadAss! swimming with sharks in the Bahamas.

In 2014, Hauserman was interviewed by E! True Hollywood Story while pregnant and one month after the birth of her son at her home in Boca Raton, Florida. She discussed a variety events from her previous reality television career to her new life as a mother.

In January 2015, she appeared in an episode of CNBC's American Greed. The story was of Tim Durham, titled "The Playboy of Indiana". Hauserman recounted a party she attended hosted by Durham in 2007.

In 2021, Hauserman was featured on Andy Cohen's documentary series on the E! Network. The documentary told the story of the evolution of reality television from its beginnings to current day productions. Megan Wants a Millionaire was featured as being one of the most highly anticipated and talked about shows on VH1 during the celebreality era before its cancellation, sealing its role in reality television history. Her time on Rock of Love, I Love Money and Rock of Love: Charm School was also highlighted.

== Personal life ==
Hauserman is a 2005 graduate of the University of Illinois at Chicago, where she earned a degree in accounting. She has worked with many charities including; Susan G. Komen for the Cure, she also regularly works with animal rescue charities.

In 2014, Hauserman and her pet chihuahua Lily, won a trophy in the Lighthouse Point Dog Show in the category "Smallest Dog".

During an interview with MSN TV News, when asked about what she was going to do with her life after Megan Wants a Millionaire, she claimed she wanted to get married, have children and become an expert tennis player. In September 2014, Hauserman gave birth to her first son at West Boca Medical Center in Boca Raton, Florida. Hauserman's husband and father of her son is professional golfer and Fuel U Fast Inc. owner Derren Edward.

== Filmography ==
Year	Title	Role	Notes
2005	Jerry Springer	Self; model	1 episode
2007	Playboy Cyber Girls	Self; model	
2007	Beauty and the Geek season 3	Self; contestant	Winner, all episodes
2008	Rock of Love with Bret Michaels season 2	Self; contestant	5th place, 10 episodes
2008	I Love Money season 1	Self; contestant	3rd place, all episodes
2008	Fox Reality Really Awards	Self	TV special
2008	Rock of Love: Charm School	Self; contestant	10th place, 6 episodes
2009	The Great Debate	Self; panelist	5 episodes
2009	Megan Wants a Millionaire	Self; bachelorette	Season cancelled after 3 episodes
2009	Sexiest Women of Reality TV Swimsuit Calendar Edition	Self; model	TV special
2009	Sexiest Women of Reality TV: Bikini Babes	Self; model	TV special
2010	Nancy Grace	Self; guest	1 episode
2010	Rock of Love Girls: Where Are They Now	Self	TV special
2010	BadAss!	Badass girl	1 episode
2011	True Crime with Aphrodite Jones	Self; guest	1 episode
2014	The E! True Hollywood Story: Life After Reality TV	Self; feature	1 episode
2015	American Greed	Self; guest	1 episode
2021	For Real: The Story of Reality TV	Self; guest	1 episode
2023	The Playboy Murders	Self; guest	1 episode

== Awards and accomplishments ==
Year	Award	Result	Category	Series	Notes
2008	Fox Reality Awards	Won	Favorite Awkward Moment	Rock of Love 2 VH1	Mary Carey and Brandi Cunningham of VH1 fame also went to receive the award.
