= List of programmes broadcast by FX (Italian TV channel) =

This is a list of television programs broadcast by FX in Italy.

== Programming ==
- 80° Minuto
- The A-Team
- Barbershop: The Series
- Barzecole
- Battlestar Galactica
- Baywatch
- Beach Patrol
- The Benny Hill Show
- Blade: The Series
- Burn Notice
- Carpoolers
- CHiPs
- Ciak Si Giri
- COPS
- The Dead Zone
- The Dresden Files
- The Dukes of Hazzard
- Eureka
- Fans United
- Fantasies
- Fermata d'Autobus
- Foursome (Season 2)
- Hotel Erotica
- International Fight League
- It's Always Sunny in Philadelphia
- The Kill Point
- Kojak
- Line of Fire
- Mad Men
- Magnum, P.I.
- Mandrake
- Married... with Children
- Matrioshki
- Miami Vice
- Mr. Bean
- My Name Is Earl
- Playmakers
- Poker Babies
- The Pretender
- Quasi TG
- S.O.S. Tata
- Sexy Camera all'Italiana
- Sexy Car Wash
- Sexy Girls Next Door
- Skill Factor
- Son of the Beach
- Sons of Anarchy
- Le Star del Pallone
- Stargate SG-1
- T. J. Hooker
- Testees
- Threat Matrix
- Totally Busted
- Underbelly
- Walker, Texas Ranger
- Wanted
- World's Wildest Police Videos
- The X-Files
