= Sean Pomper =

Sean Pomper is a creator/ inventor who came to light in the early 2000s with his Invention of Flavor Spray.

Flavor Spray was a food flavor spray. Invented by Pomper and celebrity chef David Burke, Flavor Spray landed into Time (magazine)'s 2005 Most Amazing Inventions.

Pomper created the cult classic film Reality Horror Night starring reality stars like Erik Chopin, Destiney as well as celebrities like Joseph Gannascoli, Gina Lynn and Matthew Underwood from Zoey 101. His next film Killer Hoo-Ha was actually named from Fangoria magazine.

Pomper invented "The Diet Fork" and created the ice cream franchise Nitro. Nitro makes Ice Cream using Liquid Nitrogen.
