= Rock of Love with Bret Michaels season 2 =

Rock of Love with Bret Michaels
- Season 2
- The cast of Rock of Love 2 (1 not pictured)
- Starring: Bret Michaels
- No. of episodes: 14

Release
- Original network: VH1
- Original release: January 13 – April 20, 2008

Season chronology
- ← Previous; Season 1

The second season of Rock of Love with Bret Michaels was confirmed by VH1 in October 2007. On December 8, 2007, VH1 started playing advertisements for Rock of Love 2 with Bret Michaels. The second season premiered on January 13, 2008.

== Production and legal problems ==
In April 2008 a breach-of-contract lawsuit was filed against both Michaels and the show's producers by the owner of the mansion, Ray Sahranavard. He claims that there was about $380,000 worth of damages done to the mansion, and that the producers failed to get insurance that they had previously promised to purchase for the house. Sahranavard stated that there were multiple holes in the walls and ceilings, the doors had been removed, and that almost the entire interior of the house had been repainted. He also claimed that most of the landscaping was either dead or dying.

== Contestants ==
Name	Age	Hometown	Eliminated!
Ambre Lake	37	St. Louis, Missouri	Winner
Daisy de la Hoya	25	Denver, Colorado/Los Angeles, California	Runner-Up
Destiney Sue Moore	31	Libby, Montana	Episode 11
Jessica Kinni	25	Scottsdale, Arizona	Episode 10
Megan Hauserman	25	Forest Park, Illinois	Episode 9
Kristy Joe Muller	26	Newport Beach, California	Episode 8
Inna Dmitrenko	23	Kildeer, Illinois	Episode 7
Catherine Brown	45	Montana	Episode 6
Peyton Turner	38	Danville, Virginia	Episode 6
Aubry Fisher	32	Pacific Grove, California	Episode 4^{a}
Angelique Morgan	28	Paris, France	Episode 3
Roxy Collins	24	Atlanta, Georgia	Episode 3
Korie Hutchinson	25	Malden, Massachusetts	Episode 2
Niki Kuskey	29	Chapin, South Carolina	Episode 2
Sara Wilson	28	India	Episode 2
Courtney Van Dusen	30	San Francisco, California	Episode 1/2*
Erin Martin	24	Berrien Springs, Michigan	Episode 1
Missi Chancey	26	Waycross, Georgia	Episode 1
Ashley Dingess	24	Burbank, California	Episode 1
Jackye Migliaccio	25	Irvine, California	Episode 1

- Courtney was eliminated in the first episode but due to her not attending the elimination ceremony, she was asked to leave the next morning.

^^{a}Contestant Bret planned to eliminate

== Elimination order ==
Bret's Call-out Order
#	Contestants	Episodes											
#	Contestants	1	2	3	4	5	6	7	8	9	10	11	13
1	Ambre	**Megan**	Inna	**Destiney**	Daisy	Ambre	Jessica	Ambre	Ambre	Ambre	Daisy	Ambre	Ambre
2	Angelique	**Daisy**	Peyton	**Daisy**	Ambre	Destiney	Ambre	Destiney	Daisy	Destiney	Ambre	Daisy	Daisy
3	Ashley	**Destiney**	Ambre	Inna	Peyton	Kristy Joe	Daisy	Jessica	Jessica	Daisy	Destiney	Destiney	
4	Aubry	Aubry	**Destiney**	Aubry	Inna	Megan	Megan	Megan	Destiney	Jessica	Jessica		
5	Catherine	Peyton	Megan	Peyton	Catherine	Inna	Destiney	Daisy	Megan	Megan			
6	Courtney	Inna	**Daisy**	Catherine	Jessica	Jessica	Kristy Joe	Kristy Joe	Kristy Joe				
7	Daisy	Roxy	**Roxy**	Ambre	Destiney	Catherine	Inna	Inna					
8	Destiney	Korie	Jessica	Megan	Megan	Peyton	Catherine						
9	Erin	Jessica	Kristy Joe	Jessica	Kristy Joe	Daisy	Peyton						
10	Inna	Sara	Catherine	Kristy Joe	Aubry								
11	Jackye	Catherine	Aubry	Angelique									
12	Jessica	Kristy Joe	Angelique	Roxy									
13	Korie	Niki	Korie										
14	Kristy Joe	Angelique	Niki										
15	Megan	Ambre	Sara										
16	Missi	Courtney											
17	Niki	**Erin**											
18	Peyton	Missi											
19	Roxy	Ashley											
20	Sara	Jackye											

- Contestants in **bold** indicates that they received V.I.P. Access/Passes.

The contestant won the competition.
The contestant went on a solo date with Bret.
The contestant went on a group date with Bret.
The contestant was eliminated.
The contestant won a date with Bret, but was eliminated.
The contestant won a date with Bret, but voluntarily withdrew from the competition.
The contestant was called down first, but was eliminated before the elimination ceremony began.
The contestant did not attend the elimination ceremony and was eliminated the next morning.
The contestant quit the competition.
The contestant did not receive a pass, but was allowed to stay due to another contestant quitting the competition.
The contestant won a date with Bret and did not receive a pass, but was allowed to stay due to another contestant quitting the competition.

- In Episode 1, Bret had the final pass for Jackye, although she came down and decided to quit the competition due to her anxiety of being there. Therefore, Bret decided to give the final pass to Ambre, and allow her to stay.
- In Episode 1, Courtney got drunk and passed out on her bed. She slept throughout the elimination ceremony. After the elimination ceremony was over, Bret said that Courtney was allowed to stay until the next morning where she would be told that her tour ends here.
- In Episode 4, Aubry chose to give up her spot before the last pass was given, only for Bret to reveal it after she left that she was to be eliminated anyway
- In Episode 5, Bret did not eliminate anyone and stated he was "saving the best for last" referring to Daisy.
- In Episode 11, Bret called down Destiney and eliminated her, no passes were handed out and the remaining contestants' names are listed in alphabetical order.
- Episode 12 was a recap episode.

== Episodes ==
=== Back to the Rocking Horse ===
First aired January 13, 2008

Bret Michaels, lead singer of rock band Poison, is back looking for love, and this time he means it! Twenty more beautiful babes vie for his love and affection. Some bare more than their souls in an attempt to grab Bret's attention. Only fifteen will stay after an elimination ceremony with two startling surprises.

— VH1 Episode Summary

- V.I.P.'s: Daisy, Destiney, Erin, Megan
- Bottom 6: Ambre, Ashley, Courtney, Erin, Jackye, Missi
- Withdrew: Jackye
- Eliminated: Ashley, Erin, Missi
- Allowed to Stay: Ambre, Courtney
- Reasons for Elimination:
  - Jackye: Quit because she stated that she has anxiety and could not handle being there*
  - Ashley: Didn't stand out to Bret
  - Missi: Didn't stand out to Bret
  - Erin: Bret felt like she was too young and innocent
  - Courtney: Because she missed the elimination ceremony due to being too intoxicated
- Note: Ambre was originally planned to be eliminated. But because Jackye quit, Ambre was allowed to stay and ultimately won the competition.

=== Peep Show ===
First aired January 20, 2008

Fifteen girls better watch what they say...especially when they're on a dare. Meanwhile in the first ever Peep Show Contest, the girls all compete for a date with Bret by showing off their greatest "talents." To stir things up at the house, Bret decides to hold an old school dance off. Three girls fail to make the cut.

— VH1 Episode Summary

- Challenge Winners: Ambre, Daisy, Peyton
- Bottom Four: Angelique, Korie, Niki, Sara
- Eliminated: Korie, Niki, Sara
- Reasons for Eliminations:
  - Korie: She still had not made an impression on Bret
  - Niki: Bret felt that she did not have the confidence to be with him
  - Sara: Sara allegedly said that she was on the show on a dare. She denied it, but Bret didn't believe her.

=== Stroller Derby ===
First aired January 27, 2008

Bret might be a big time rock star but he's also a big time family man. He needs a woman who's got those motherly instincts and what better way to find out than to put them in roller skates, hand them a stroller and see if they can outskate a fearsome foursome that includes a surprise guest, Lacey! But things turn ugly when the most hated girl in the house gets alone time with Bret -- the fangs come out and the girls are out for blood! Bret goes with his gut feeling and sends two girls packing.

— VH1 Episode Summary

- Challenge Winners: Aubry, Angelique, Kristy Joe, Inna
- Bottom Three: Angelique, Kristy Joe, Roxy
- Eliminated: Angelique, Roxy
- Reasons for Elimination:
  - Roxy: Bret felt she was not making an effort to get to know him after not using her VIP Pass
  - Angelique: Bret felt she was too much of a quote "free spirit" for him

=== A Ride on the Wild Side ===
First aired February 10, 2008

Bret wants a girl with good manual skills so he tests their aptitude with nuts and bolts in a custom motorcycle build off. One girl gets down and dirty, bringing her team both victory and a group date -- a pinup photo shoot. Emotions run high as the girls continue to fall for Bret but are threatened by his connections with other girls. Two girls buckle under the pressure leaving Bret with a huge dilemma about whom to send packing.

— VH1 Episode Summary

- Challenge Winners: Ambre, Aubry, Daisy, Inna, Megan
- Bottom Two: Aubry, Kristy Joe
- Quit: Aubry
- Reason for Withdrawal:
  - Aubry: Quit because she felt like Kristy Joe deserved to stay because she liked Bret so much and she felt like she was her friend Kristy Joe a gift by quitting, however Bret revealed that she was going to be eliminated anyway because Bret felt that she was incredibly jealous, and this made him nervous since they had only known each other for a few days.

=== Mud Bowl II ===
First aired February 17, 2008

The "Divine Nine" compete in the second annual Bret Michaels Mud Bowl! Only this time they have to play in harsh rain, snow and wind! Bret's attention shifts from the former front-runner to an overlooked PYT, while the other girls struggle to get his attention.

— VH1 Episode Summary

Fallen Angels: Daisy, Destiney, Inna, Kristy Joe
Sweethearts: Catherine, Peyton, Ambre, Jessica

- Challenge Winners: Fallen Angels
- MVP: Daisy
- Bottom Two: Daisy*, Peyton
- Eliminated: No one
- Episode Notes:
  - Megan was not picked by the team captains to compete in the Mud Bowl II challenge since they needed an even number of players.
  - Bret stated he did not want to eliminate anyone without giving them a chance, so he eliminated no one this episode.
  - Bret stated that he was "saving the best for last" referring to Daisy.

=== Once a Cowgirl ===
First aired February 24, 2008

For the two women who have yet to win a date with Bret, Rodeo's Rocking Rodeo could be their last chance to make a connection. Bret takes the winning team to a "dinner in the dark," and when the lights go down, so do their inhibitions! Can the losers wipe their tears away in time to stay in the saddle, or will they get bucked from the competition?

— VH1 Episode Summary

- Challenge Winners: Ambre, Destiney, Kristy Joe, Jessica
- Bottom Three: Catherine, Inna, Peyton
- Eliminated: Catherine, Peyton
- Reasons for Eliminations:
- Catherine: Bret did not feel that he and Catherine were connecting.
- Peyton: Bret felt she was more of a friend than a love interest.

=== Red, White and a Little... ===
First aired March 2, 2008

The remaining seven girls display their ability to rock an audience as they perform at a show for military veterans. Later on, all hell breaks loose at a lovely family style dinner in which one girl is called out for showing Bret no love at all.

— VH1 Episode Summary

- Challenge Winners: Jessica, Megan
- Bottom Two: Inna, Kristy Joe
- Eliminated: Inna
- Reasons for Elimination
  - Inna: Bret felt that Inna was no longer a front runner, and that she was now disappearing in the crowd.

=== Video Vixens ===
First aired March 16, 2008

With only six girls left in the house, tensions run high as Bret tests the girls' creativity by making them shoot, direct and edit their own music videos. Who will shine and who will be left on the cutting room floor? When one of his favorites has a major meltdown, Bret is forced to make his most drastic decision yet.

— VH1 Episode Summary

- Challenge Winners: Ambre, Kristy Joe, Megan
- Bottom Two: Kristy Joe, Megan
- Withdrew: Kristy Joe^{[w]}
- Reasons for Withdrawal:
  - Kristy Joe: She felt that she needed to deal with things at home before she entered a serious relationship, and that she was under too much stress. Bret did not reveal to the others that Kristy Joe would have received the last pass and Megan would have been eliminated. After saying goodbye to Kristy Joe, Bret dropped the pass by the door to show the viewers that the last pass was for Kristy Joe.

^[w] Megan won a date with Bret, but did not receive a pass at elimination. However, Kristy Joe decided that she needed to go home and take care of some things. Because she quit, Megan was safe and nobody was eliminated.

=== Going to Ex-tremes ===
First aired March 23, 2008

Bret shocks the girls by inviting their exes. He takes the guys out on the town to dig up dirt on the girls. Meanwhile the final five girls are left to stew back at the house under the supervision of yet one more surprise guest Heather Chadwell. Secrets are revealed, sparks fly, and mayhem ensues on the craziest day yet at the Rock of Love mansion.

— VH1 Episode Summary

- Bottom Two: Jessica, Megan
- Eliminated: Megan
- Reasons for Elimination:
  - Megan: When the girls' ex-boyfriends came to the house, Megan cried and yelled at her ex-boyfriend when he revealed he was only there to promote his bar, which made her upset and she had never cried about anything when she was in the house except for her ex-boyfriend which when Bret found out he thought she still was in love with her boyfriend and decided to end her tour.

=== Bitter Suite ===
First aired March 30, 2008

Bret surprises the final four with a trip to Las Vegas. One girl's lies cause Bret to question her intentions toward him. Bret invites an old friend Heather Chadwell to stir things up between the remaining girls and causes everyone to call out the girl who's been keeping secrets.

— VH1 Episode Summary

- Bottom 2: Destiney, Jessica
- Eliminated: Jessica
- Reasons for Elimination:
  - Jessica: Bret felt that she was not 100% ready for his lifestyle

=== Rockin' the 'Rents ===
First aired April 6, 2008

Bret wants to know more about the three remaining girls, and what better way to get the 411 than moving their parents into the house! Bret is surprised when he meets the sister of a girl's ex-boyfriend instead of her parent. Bret takes each family on a date, and someone gets a tattoo! Accusations fly as one girl goes home, and the remaining two head to the finale.

— VH1 Episode Summary

- Eliminated: Destiney
- Reasons for Elimination:
  - Destiney: When Daisy and Ambre revealed that they had fallen in love with Bret, Bret asked Destiney if she was in love, when she said she was not sure, Bret ended her tour.
- NOTE: On the show Destiney's dad Tommy revealed that he had liver cancer and only had a few months left to live. After hearing Tommy compliment Bret on his fantastic bikes, Bret took Destiney's family on a Harley motorcycle ride because he knew Tommy would enjoy it very much. Shortly after the show wrapped he died. The episode was dedicated in his memory.

=== The Clip Show ===
First aired April 8, 2008

This was a bonus recap episode of the season.

=== Bret's Rock of Love ===
First aired April 13, 2008

Bret takes his final two girls south of the border to spend some quality, romantic time with each one before making his final choice. Guards come down and gloves come off as the girls open their hearts and fight for their man. One girl will be Bret's rock of love, the other will leave heartbroken.

— VH1 Episode Summary

- Dates: Bret takes each girl on an individual date.
- Ambre's Date: they get a romantic massage.
- Daisy's Date: they go on a boat and Daisy gets really sea sick. Bret has a romantic evening with Daisy.
- Final Two: Ambre and Daisy
- Bret's Rock of Love: Ambre
- Eliminated: Daisy
- Reasons for Elimination:
  - Daisy: Bret felt that there were too many secrets involving Daisy and her past with ex-boyfriend Charles, and he felt that she may have needed him more than she wanted him.

=== Reunion ===
First aired April 20, 2008

19 girls (1 did not attend) come back for the reunion but only a select few get to be onstage to talk with Bret. Aubry and Kristy Joe talk about their relationship while Daisy and Heather have a showdown.

== Additional cast ==
- Big John - All Episodes
- Lacey Conner - Cameo, January 27, 2008
- LA Derby Dolls - Cameo, January 27, 2008
- Cindy "Rodeo" Steedle - Cameo, February 24, 2008
- Dean Karr - Cameo, March 16, 2008
- Heather Chadwell - Cameo, March 23, 2008 and March 30, 2008

== Ratings ==
The season finale ranked third in the week for cable shows, behind SpongeBob SquarePants and The Memory Keeper's Daughter.

== After the show ==
- Ambre made a cameo appearance on the third season of Rock of Love.
- Daisy had her own dating show entitled Daisy of Love
- Destiney and Megan appeared on the first season of I Love Money where they placed 13th and 3rd respectively.
- Angelique, Courtney, Destiney, Jessica, Kristy Joe, Inna and Megan appeared on the second season of Charm School where they placed 12th, 13th, 2nd, 5th, 6th, 9th, and 10th respectively.
- Prior to the show, Megan won the third season of Beauty and the Geek. She also had her own dating show called Megan Wants a Millionaire, but was canceled on August 23, 2009, due to a controversy involving castmember Ryan Jenkins.
- Angelique appeared on the second season of I Love Money where she placed 6th. She also appeared on the fourteenth series of Celebrity Big Brother in 2014, where she placed 11th.
- Erin appeared on the second season of NBC The Voice, where she was on "Team Cee Lo". She was eliminated on April 11, 2012.
