= Rock of Love: Charm School =

- Season 2
- Cast of Rock of Love: Charm School (left to right): Top: Angelique, Jessica, Brandi C., Megan, Inna, Heather, Courtney Bottom: Brandi M., Rodeo, Lacey, Dallas, Destiney, Kristy Joe, Raven
- Starring: Sharon Osbourne; Riki Rachtman; Daniella Clarke
- Presented by: Sharon Osbourne
- No. of contestants: 14
- Winner: Brandi Mahon
- No. of episodes: 12

Release
- Original network: VH1
- Original release: October 12, 2008 – January 4, 2009

Season chronology
- ← Previous; Flavor of Love Girls: Charm School Next → Charm School with Ricki Lake

Rock of Love: Charm School, known as Sharon Osbourne's Charm School in the UK, and as Charm School: Rock of Love Girls in Germany, is the second season of the VH1 reality television series Charm School. Fourteen contestants from both seasons of Rock of Love with Bret Michaels are competing to develop proper etiquette in order to win $100,000. Sharon Osbourne is the host. Rock of Love: Charm School first aired on VH1 on October 12, 2008. Brandi Mahon was ultimately named Charm School Queen and was awarded the $100,000.

== Ten Commandments ==
1. Thou Shalt Rock Together
2. Thou Shalt Rock It With Style
3. Thou Shalt Be Takin' Care of Business
4. Thou Shalt Not Rock Rude
5. Thou Shalt Rock Thy Body
6. Thou Shalt Rock At Love
7. Thou Shalt Express Thyself
8. Thou Shalt Know Who Thou Art
9. Thou Shalt Rock Unto Others
10. Thou Shalt Be Fully Rockin'

== Contestants ==
Cast member	Original season	Finish
Brandi "Brandi M" Mahon	Rock of Love	Winner
Destiney Sue Moore	Rock of Love 2	Episode 11
Lacey Conner	Rock of Love	Episode 11
Heather Chadwell	Rock of Love	Episode 9
Jessica Kinni	Rock of Love 2	Episode 8
Kristy Joe Muller	Rock of Love 2	Episode 8
Brandi "Brandi C" Cunningham	Rock of Love	Episode 7
Dallas Harrison	Rock of Love	Episode 6
Inna Dimitrenko	Rock of Love 2	Episode 5
Megan Hauserman	Rock of Love 2	Episode 4
Cindy "Rodeo" Steedle	Rock of Love	Episode 3
Angelique "Frenchy" Morgan	Rock of Love 2	Episode 2
Courtney Van Dusen	Rock of Love 2	Episode 1
Raven Williams	Rock of Love	Episode 1 (Quit)

== Episode progress ==
#	Contestants	Episodes										
#	Contestants	1	2	3	4	5	6	7	8	9	11	
1	Brandi M.	SAFE	BTM 3	SAFE	BTM 2	BTM 3	BTM 3	WIN	WIN	BTM 3	WIN	WINNER
2	Destiney	SAFE	WIN	WIN	WIN	WIN	SAFE	SAFE	SAFE	WIN	BTM 2	OUT
3	Lacey	BTM 3	WIN	BTM 4	WIN	SAFE	BTM 2	SAFE	BTM 3	BTM 3	OUT	
4	Heather	SAFE	SAFE	WIN	SAFE	WIN	WIN	SAFE	SAFE	OUT	HELP	
5	Jessica	SAFE	WIN	WIN	SAFE	BTM 2	SAFE	SAFE	OUT			
6	Kristy Joe	SAFE	WIN	SAFE	WIN	SAFE	WIN	SAFE	OUT			
7	Brandi C.	SAFE	WIN	SAFE	SAFE	SAFE	BTM 4	OUT			HELP	
8	Dallas	BTM 3	BTM 2	WIN	WIN	WIN	OUT					
9	Inna	SAFE	SAFE	BTM 2	SAFE	OUT						
10	Megan	SAFE	WIN	BTM 3	OUT						HELP	
11	Rodeo	SAFE	SAFE	OUT								
12	Angelique	SAFE	OUT									
13	Courtney	OUT										
14	Raven	QUIT										

The contestant won the competition.
The contestant won the challenge and was safe from expulsion.
The contestant did not win the challenge but was safe from expulsion.
The contestant was at risk for expulsion.
The contestant was expelled.
The contestant withdrew from the competition.
The contestant returned to "help their enemy" in the penultimate challenge.

- In Episode 4, Brandi M was part of the winning team, but was at risk for fighting with Megan after the challenge.
- In Episode 7, there were no contestants at risk for elimination since Sharon expelled Brandi C. before calling any other contestants down for elimination.
- Episode 10 was a recap episode.
- In Episode 11, the three remaining girls got assistance from their "enemies".

== Episodes ==
=== One Bad Apple ===
First aired October 12, 2008

Sharon Osbourne welcomes 14 girls from both seasons of Rock Of Love to Charm School and explains that the girl who shows the most improvement in class, manners, charm and style will be declared "Charm School Queen" and win US$100,000. The girls rush into the house to find their rooms. Heather is upset because she's assigned to be in the same room with Brandi C. and Megan; she's hated both of them since they got her kicked off of I Love Money. Dallas is also unhappy because she is forced to room with Lacey, their dispute from Season 1 still unresolved. Brandi C. introduces Megan to Lacey and the two form an alliance. Once outside, Lacey begins to antagonize Dallas and tickles her butt. Becoming upset, Dallas states she dislikes being touched in inappropriate places and pours her drink on Lacey. Lacey responds by throwing her drink on Dallas, after which Dallas throws an apple at Lacey, which strikes her in the ear. Meanwhile, Jessica, Megan, Lacey, and Brandi C. make an attempt to make friends with Raven, while Raven remains uninterested in communicating with them. Raven then fights with Megan, Jessica, Lacey, and Brandi C. because they feel Raven is acting as if she is superior to the others and to Charm School. Lacey goes as far as to attempt to knock what she claims she thought was a wig off Ravens head. Raven then moons Jessica, Lacey, Brandi C, and Megan. Courtney tries to limit her alcohol consumption, while Brandi M. purposely gives her vodka, but fails and passes out.

As the administration ceremony begins, Courtney is inebriated to the point of having difficulty to enter the room, and must be helped by Raven and Rodeo. Sharon introduces the deans, Riki and Daniella, and then shows the girls DVDs depicting their worst moments from Rock Of Love. Courtney feels unwell and reeks of alcohol. Thus, Sharon has Destiney and Jessica take her up to her room so she can sober up. While the girls prepare for the first elimination, Courtney wakes up, composes herself and shows up for the elimination ceremony. Riki asks Raven if she really wants to be on the show, following Dallas having informed him earlier that Raven feels she does not need to be on the show and wants to back to Long Beach. As she begins to talk about herself, Sharon concludes that Raven's decision to quit is quite clear and takes away her pledge pin; Raven leaves. At this point, the tension lightens as the contestants assume that Raven's departure is the only elimination for the episode. However, Sharon informs them that they will still make an elimination. Sharon calls Courtney, Lacey and Dallas down to the carpet. Lacey is on the carpet for having a "diva attitude" and having constantly bullied or antagonized the other contestants; Dallas has been called down for her temper and for throwing an apple at Lacey; Courtney is there for her apparent alcohol problems. Sharon confronts Courtney and says Charm School cannot help her with drinking problems, but says they can help her by admitting her to a drug rehabilitation program. Courtney is then expelled from Charm School.

- Voluntarily Quit: Raven
- Bottom Three: Courtney, Dallas, Lacey
- Expelled: Courtney

Reason For Elimination

- Raven - Voluntarily quit because she doesn't feel she belongs in Charm School and believes she's above it.
- Courtney - Courtney got drunk once again and Sharon tells her that Charm School can't help her with her drinking problems and suggested she goes to rehab.

=== Quit Yer Beaching ===
First aired October 19, 2008

The episode begins with Brandi C., Megan and Lacey scheming and discussing about their three "targets" for forcing into elimination: Dallas, Brandi M. and Heather. Heather reads a note from Sharon notifying them of their first challenge and that they will have to wear their uniforms. The girls are taken by bus to the beach and in less than five minutes, the girls quickly find that their visit to the beach will not be so enjoyable. The girls are interrupted by the drill sergeant from the first season of Charm School, Sgt. Jones, who tells them their first challenge will focus on teamwork. Sgt. Jones has the girls march in two lines crying an embarrassing chant. Suddenly, Dallas loses her bandanna and is forced to sit out while the rest of the girls do push-ups. Brandi C., has a difficult time doing push-ups and Sgt. Jones has her sit out. Their next challenge is to move fifteen sandbags to a platform without dropping any, and should the girls drop any to the ground, then they will have to start over. The girls start out strong but then they drop a bag. Lacey sees an opportunity to push Dallas by throwing the sandbags forcefully so Dallas misses most of them, and then Sgt. Jones sits her out for being the weakest link. Brandi C. struggles as well, which leads to Sgt. Jones yelling at her and forcing her to sit out. She begins to cry. Megan also handles the challenge badly because she keeps breaking a nail, much to the displeasure of the rest of the team. Eventually, the girls do manage to move all the sandbags to the platform. Their next challenge is for the girls to pull Megan, as a punishment for laziness, in a sled to the beach towels. The girls struggle to pull the sled containing Megan, and matters are made worse when Brandi C. joins her best friend Megan in on the sled when given the opportunity. Back at the house, Brandi M. scorns Megan and Brandi C. for their lack of teamwork and calls them fat. Later that night, more girls join in and chide later that night while Megan and Brandi C. are trying to sleep, and then Brandi M. draws obscene images on their pictures posted on their beds.

The next day, the girls must split into two teams of six for their next challenge. The next challenge is to set up a stage and a green room for Daniella's rock musician husband, Gilby Clarke, and the team who performs the best job will be made safe from expulsion. Lacey, Megan, Brandi C., Jessica, Kristy Joe, and Destiney are on the first team. Destiney comments that her and Kristy Joe didn't really want to be on their team. Rodeo, Heather, Brandi M., Inna, Dallas, and Angelique are on the other team. Lacey takes charge of her team and they assemble their project quickly. Sharon and the deans state that while the other team has the brawn, Lacey's team definitely has the brains. Riki points out how well Megan is working because instead of carrying heavy items one at a time, she carries them on the rolling speakers. The other team carries the heavy items one at a time and takes a slower pace while following the instructions. Angelique quickly becomes confused and can barely help her team. She seeks help from Dallas, who barely helps her. Lacey's team ends up winning and they win the immunity. Back at the house, Dallas and Heather discuss how Angelique hurt their team. Angelique and Dallas then get into an altercation, accusing each other of throwing one and other under the bus. Megan and Brandi C. bring the vandalized pictures before Sharon, cry and accuse Brandi M. of being out to get them. Sharon is very disappointed with Brandi M.'s actions, especially that Brandi M. had drawn a penis in Brandi C.'s mouth on her picture. At elimination, Brandi M., Dallas, and Angelique are called down to the carpet. Sharon scolds Brandi M. and says her actions were childish and that she was on warning. Riki agrees, but understands why Brandi M. yelled at the girls and Brandi C. cries for being yelled at when she wasn't even at risk. Brandi M. is sent back to safety. Angelique and Dallas continue their altercation about throwing one and other under the bus, Sharon cannot choose which of the two to send home, so she asks the rest of the girls on their team who they would send home. With the exception of Heather, Lacey, and Inna, all the girls agree Angelique should go home. Sharon agrees, and Angelique is expelled for not wanting to change. Lacey states that she is disappointed that Angelique was expelled instead of Dallas.

- Challenge Winner(s): Brandi C., Destiney, Jessica, Kristy Joe, Lacey, Megan
- Bottom Three: Angelique, Brandi M., Dallas
- Expelled: Angelique

Reason For Elimination

- Angelique - Sharon feels that Angelique doesn't want to change. Also the other girls felt Dallas deserved to stay more than Angelique.

=== The Trashion Show ===
First aired October 26, 2008

At the beginning of the episode, Lacey, Brandi C. and Megan discuss their disgust over Angelique's elimination and agree that Brandi M. should be the next one eliminated. The girls then receive a note asking them to dress in their favorite outfits. They do so and then go to the classroom where the instructor, celebrity stylist Melissa Meister, reviews the outfits of Megan, Brandi C., Heather and Rodeo. Melissa Meister asks Megan what message she is sending by wearing a bikini in public. Megan says "Um, sporty?" and the girls laugh over Megan's sarcasm. Daniella asks her why she wears bikinis, because bikinis are for the beach. Megan says she likes to wear bikinis all the time to nice lunches and shopping and other activities. Heather is asked what message she is sending by wearing a revealing red dress and she says "Sexy". Megan states that Heather's message is "Old...like has-been. Kinda skanky," and the girls laugh again. When Brandi C. is asked where she would wear leopard-print lingerie, she says, "Well, I wouldn't wear this outfit to McDonald's per se", much to the girls' amusement. Rodeo is also criticized for her revealing country outfit and when Melissa asks the girls what they think Rodeo looks like in this, Lacey says "Country bumkin" and Megan says "Alligator hunter" and the girls again begin to laugh. Melissa says these are items that should not be worn outside of certain situations and they are distasteful otherwise and not classy. They are all asked to choose three girls to be made over. The girls choose Brandi C., Megan, and Heather, who are then informed that they will be modeling. They are then informed that they must divide up into three teams, and that the three models will choose their teammates. Heather chooses Jessica, Dallas and Destiney; Megan chooses Lacey and Rodeo; and Brandi C. chooses Kristy Joe, Brandi M. and Inna. They are then told they will receive $300 to go shopping at a thrift store to assemble three outfits each for their models: one for a job interview, one for a cocktail party, and one to wear to meet a boyfriend's parents. They are given an hour and can use only the items they buy at "It's A Wrap", a thrift store that stocks clothing that has been used in movies and TV shows. Megan dislikes all of the choices her teammates make for her. The hour is nearly over so they rush to the cash register. Megan notices that Rodeo had a bracelet on, and realizing that her team had no accessories, she takes the bracelet off Rodeo's wrist and considers putting it in the bag. Megan notices Brandi M. watching her so she gives it back to Rodeo. Rodeo confronts Megan and Lacey about it back at the house, while Megan and Lacey retort saying that Rodeo told them to take the bracelet. The discussion degenerates into screaming.

The next day the groups meet at the site of the fashion show and watch while their clothes are thrown into a pile, torn and stained. They are given one hour to repair the damage as best they can and then model the clothes. Project Runway season 3 winner Jeffrey Sebelia serves as a guest judge and critiques the girls. Heather's team is up on the runway first with Destiney as their emcee, and their performance is well-received all around. Heather also states that she was satisfied with the new look. Megan's team goes second with Rodeo as emcee. While Megan is interviewed on the runway, she mentions that she dislikes her second outfit, but as the emcee, Rodeo claims that Megan picked out an outfit, and Megan disagrees saying it was her least favorite and her team picked it for her. Then it was vice versa with the third outfit, which led to arguing and both contestants being warned by Sharon. Then, Brandi C.'s team goes up with Inna as emcee. Brandi C. does well on the runway, but Inna stumbles over her lines, not having rewritten them since the damaged outfits were reconstructed. In the end, Sharon says Megan's team had the best looks, but Megan's team is prevented from winning because of poor teamwork evidenced by the bickering, and possible cheating. It is between Heather's and Brandi C's teams. Heather's team eventually wins because of Inna's poor delivery and how she presented herself; wearing flip-flops and having dirty hair.

When they arrive back at the mansion, Rodeo reports to Sharon's office to speak to her about the bracelet incident. Rodeo breaks down emotionally, explaining that she hates being called a liar. Sharon thinks Rodeo is "a lovely woman with a big heart", but worries about her emotions sometimes getting the best of her. Afterward, Sharon calls Megan into the office and asks her if she tried to cheat. Megan denies Rodeo's accusation. At elimination, Sharon calls down Inna, Lacey, Megan and Rodeo. After sternly disciplining Lacey and warning her to stop stirring up trouble, she tells her to step back with the other girls. Sharon focuses her attention on Megan, calling her a "conniving backstabbing little bitch", and warns her that her attempts of deception will fail. She then sends Megan back with the other girls as well. In Sharon's interview, she says that she has a strong desire to change Lacey and Megan, which is why they were not eliminated. It is then down to Inna and Rodeo. Sharon tells Inna to take pride in her appearance and spend some time in the morning on looking presentable, then sends her back. She eliminates Rodeo, saying that being in the house is doing more harm than good to her, and feels that Rodeo does not need Charm School as much as the other girls do. Dallas and most of the other girls are upset and feel that Megan staying is unfair because she lied and tried to cheat.

- Challenge Winner(s): Dallas, Destiney, Heather, Jessica
- Bottom Four: Inna, Lacey, Megan, Rodeo
- Expelled: Rodeo

Reason For Elimination

- Rodeo - Sharon felt that Rodeo never needed Charm School and that it was doing her more harm than good.

=== Every Little Thing She Does Is Tragic ===
First aired November 2, 2008

The challenge in this episode is to create, style and showcase a band for famed manager of The Police, Miles Copeland III. The teams were already picked by the deans: Destiney, Brandi M., Dallas, Lacey and Kristy Joe on the first team, Brandi C., Heather, Inna, Jessica, and Megan on the second team. Each team must consist of a band manager, a stylist, a musical director and two creative directors. The only person safe from expulsion will be the winning band manager, while the losing band manager will automatically be called down to the carpet. The first team chooses Destiney as the band manager, Dallas as the band stylist, Lacey as the music director and Brandi M. and Kristy Joe as the creative directors. On the second team, Brandi C. assumes the band manager position, while Heather works as the band stylist, Jessica as the musical director and Megan and Inna as the creative directors. Next, the girls hold auditions for fifteen musicians. Each band must pick a lead vocalist, a drummer and two guitarists. Destiney's team picks the jester hat-wearing "Jezter" as their lead vocalist, Daisy De La Hoya's ex-boyfriend Charles as one of their guitarists, and Orrin as drummer. Brandi C.'s team pick Maura as their singer, Cole as their guitar player and Marcus as drummer. The teams now must pick a song from a list for their band to play the next day. Destiney's team picks the song "Mexican Radio" while Brandi C.'s team chooses "America The Beautiful". Lacey takes control, calling on her musical background, to which Destiney objects. On the second team there is lack of communication, Brandi C. assumes her team will win.

The next day, Maura, the singer for Brandi C.'s team, is late and has not returned telephone calls. Shortly before going on stage, Maura informs them that she was late because she was at the hospital for her brother, who had sustained a spinal cord injury. Brandi M. is sympathetic and wishes Maura's brother good luck in the hospital and Maura cries for her brother. Brandi C. mishears and thinks Brandi M. is making her singer cry on purpose and yells at her. Brandi C. then tells Heather and Inna who also yell at Brandi M., who begins to cry and apologize to Maura. After hearing Brandi M.'s side of the story, Heather and Inna apologize to her. Destiney cries because she can't handle the pressure.

Destiney's band, called "Addiction", goes first. In the end, the judges rate "Addiction" highly compared to Brandi C's band, "Chosen", even though they think Maura of "Chosen" was the better singer. Brandi C's team lost due to poor direction, poor song choice, and wardrobe problems when the female lead singer has a camel toe visible on her shorts. Sharon picks Destiney's team as the winner and Destiney wins immunity. At the house, Brandi C. frets because she knows she will automatically be called down to the carpet and talks to Megan and Lacey about it in their room. Brandi M. knows she will be under scrutiny and wants to gain revenge on Megan and Brandi C. for making her cry. Megan orders Brandi M. to leave the room when she is caught eavesdropping, at which point where Brandi M shoves Megan. The altercation ends when Megan kicks Brandi M. Brandi M. then writes Sharon a note explaining the confrontation and slides it under her office door.

At elimination, Sharon announces that Brandi C. will not be on the carpet as planned, but instead, Megan and Brandi M. are called down for their altercation. Sharon says that from the beginning she said she would not tolerate violence, and that what happened was completely unacceptable. Brandi C. states that Brandi M. pushed Megan, and that Megan responded in self-defense. Heather proceeds to defend Brandi M. Sharon then expels Megan, scolding her for not wanting to change and for being entirely remorseless. Sharon stated that Megan was extremely smart, but that she shows no remorse for her actions and therefore had to expel her from Charm School. Brandi C. loses her composure, cries, and declares that if Megan is expelled she will quit the show as well, but Sharon sternly warns her against delivering ultimatums and convinces her to take some time to consider her actions. Heather, Inna, Brandi M. and Dallas celebrate Megan's expulsion, while Brandi C. continues to cry and does not want to give Megan's dog to Riki. She eventually hands over the dog and continues to cry. Brandi C and Lacey then keep on warning to avenge Megan's elimination.

- Challenge Winner(s): Destiney
- Bottom Two: Brandi M., Megan
- Expelled: Megan

Reason For Elimination

- Megan - Megan was remorseless and unwilling to change.

=== Royally Screwed ===
First aired November 9, 2008

Brandi C. and Lacey wake up, still grieving Megan's elimination, and vow to avenge her. The next lesson is for the girls to learn how behave in polite company, such as how to correctly eat soup and how to sit in a chair. The girls' skills are put to the test when they will have to entertain a duchess. The winning team will be safe from expulsion. Daniella picks Dallas, Kristy Joe and Inna as the team captains, because she has yet to see them take a leadership role. Dallas picks Destiney and Heather for her team, Kristy Joe picks Brandi M. and Jessica for her team, which leaves Inna with Brandi C. and Lacey. The girls receive specific instructions on behavior around the duchess; they must eat and drink at the pace of the duchess, they cannot turn their backs on the duchess, they must address the duchess as "Her Royal Highness the Duchess of Birmingshire Paige Irvingcrow Harrington", they cannot show any cleavage, and they must not serve alcohol to the duchess, regardless of her instructions.

Inna's team goes first, but by exposing décolletage, Inna immediately puts her team at risk. She is then informed that the duchess is offended by her indecent attire, and goes to cover up with a shawl in the style of the others. Then when entertaining the duchess, the duchess asks for wine, to which Inna initially agrees. But she pauses, and tells the duchess that she was ordered not to serve wine, which serves to upset the duchess more. On Kristy Joe's team, Brandi M. repeatedly mispronounces the duchess' name, causing her to take offense. Sharon and Daniella, watching all of this from a monitor, laugh at her awkward mistakes. Sharon then informs the viewers that the duchess is in fact an actress. Having grown upset with Brandi M.'s slip-ups, the duchess requests that Jessica switches places with her. However, Jessica makes the mistake of telling a kitschy joke, which the duchess does not find amusing, and she requests the girls be moved again. Dallas' group starts off strongly, with Dallas making polite compliments and make good conversation, and the girls maintain their composure when they are served spotted dick and the duchess asks the girls if they had ever eaten it. Dallas' team ends up winning the challenge and wins immunity.

The next day, Sharon sends the girls a note saying there would a twist to the elimination; the losing teams would decide which girl would be called to the carpet. Destiney asked why Brandi C. and Lacey didn't help Inna cover her shoulders, since it was a team effort, and their failure cost them the victory. Brandi C. refused to discuss it. Kristy Joe's team had trouble choosing someone, initially picking Brandi M., but then changing to Jessica after convincing her that she needed to do it to prove to the judges that she had a backbone. At elimination, Kristy Joe tries to go down on the carpet instead of Jessica because she feels that their convincing Jessica to come down was underhanded, and claims that as they had not reached consensus on whom to send down, and as she was captain of the losing team, she wanted to come down. After the confusion is cleared by Brandi M., Jessica is brought down to the carpet. Inna put herself on the carpet for being weak, having reached this consensus in her team. Brandi M. is also called down for her continuous weakness. Riki says that he really dislikes seeing Brandi M. on the carpet again while Sharon says Brandi M. needs to step up, but praises her for really trying. Brandi M. is sent back. The judges then comment on Jessica's actions, saying that they did the exact opposite of their intention, making it clear that she was easily tricked. Inna is told that she should have known better than to show cleavage, and that it is clear she cannot keep up pace with the other girls. For that reason, Inna is expelled. Before the girls leave, Sharon lets the girls know that the duchess was actually an actress. At the end of the episode, viewers see a brief memorial image of the actress who played the duchess, Patricia Place, with the text that the episode has been dedicated to her memory.

- Challenge winner(s): Dallas, Destiney, Heather
- Bottom Three: Brandi M., Inna, Jessica
- Expelled: Inna

Reason For elimination

- Inna – Inna couldn't keep up the pace with the other girls as she messed up a lot in the past challenges.

=== T and A PSA ===
First aired November 16, 2008

Sharon holds a wine, cigar and liquor tasting session for the girls where they learn how to properly enjoy these things. Lacey, a supporter of animal rights, discusses bowhunting with Brandi M., at which point Kristy Joe reveals that Lacey had been eating salmon and caviar previously. Dallas calls out Lacey, accusing her of hypocrisy, and then walks away. Lacey, wanting to end it, follows Dallas to her bedroom, gets on her bed and wipes her feet on Dallas' clothes. Wanting to then make peace with Dallas, Lacey tries to speak, but Dallas refuses to discuss anything. Lacey becomes aggressive towards Dallas, shouting at her while Brandi C. holds her back. As things quiet down, Brandi C. goes into the bathroom, at which point Lacey resumes her aggression and knocks over Dallas' drink, spilling it on her and then walks away. Heather, watching all of this, is impressed with Dallas' restraint.

Later, a police officer arrives and administers breathalyzer tests to all the contestants. Kristy Joe has the lowest blood alcohol content estimate, while Dallas has the highest. The girls are grouped into teams of two based on their breathalyzer scores and are charged with making public service announcement (PSA) videos on the dangers of excessive alcohol consumption. Heather and Kristy Joe are paired up for having the lowest alcohol score, Destiney and Jessica are paired for the next lowest scores, and Brandi C. and Brandi M. are paired for the third lowest scores, leaving Dallas and Lacey to be paired together. Heather and Kristy Joe are assigned to depict the dangers of alcohol on an unborn infant, and decide to use Britney Spears as an example, producing a video in the style of TMZ. Destiney and Jessica show the dangers of alcohol on the human body. For this, Destiney dresses in a hospital gown. Brandi C. and Brandi M. are chosen to depict the effects of alcohol on the libido, whereby Brandi M. engages in a mock session of making out using an inflatable sex doll. Dallas, disgusted to be paired with Lacey, sulks for half an hour, leaving Lacey to do all the work. At this point, Dallas realizes that she would only be sabotaging herself and she works with Lacey on their topic, to depict the dangerous situations to which alcohol abuse can lead. In the end, the judges pick Heather and Kristy Joe's PSA, awarding them immunity. At elimination, Lacey, Dallas, Brandi C. and Brandi M. are brought down to the carpet. The judges scold Brandi C. and Brandi M., calling their PSA pornographic, but decide to excuse them. Then, when addressing Dallas' behavior towards Lacey, Heather and Brandi C. argue loudly over the details of Lacey's behavior towards Dallas. Sharon sends Brandi C. out of the room for speaking out of turn. Sharon then tells Lacey that although she is disgusted with her behavior, she put out effort while Dallas let their dispute disrupt their work. Thus, Sharon chooses to expel Dallas.

- Challenge Winner(s): Heather, Kristy Joe
- Bottom Four: Brandi C., Brandi M., Dallas, Lacey
- Expelled: Dallas

Reason For Elimination

- Dallas - Unlike Lacey who put in work, Dallas wasn't able to put her differences aside with Lacey and allowed their dispute to disrupt their work.

=== Fugly Dating ===
First aired November 23, 2008

Sharon has her hands full teaching the seven remaining girls the right way to find love. The girls learn several things to keep in mind when on a date, such as not talking about ex-boyfriends, taking things slow, and abstaining from sex early in the relationship. For their challenge, the girls must try to win over three eligible bachelors with just their personalities and not their looks. In order to accomplish this, Sharon has professional make-up artists make the girls appear less attractive. With the girls' new looks (and new names), they must win over the bachelors using the techniques they have learned. The three bachelors are Charlie O'Connell, Ace Young and John Wolfe. Kristy Joe struggles with this, realizing how much she relies on her looks when interacting with men, while Brandi M. and Destiney do very well. John and Charlie pick Brandi M. for a second date, while Ace picks Destiney. With a majority of the votes, Brandi M. wins the challenge and is safe from expulsion. In addition, she is allowed to pick a second girl to go to a club with the bachelors, dressed normally, while the others must go in their ugly make-up and clothing. Brandi M. picks Destiney, and Heather feels hurt that Brandi M. didn't pick her. At the club, Brandi C. drinks excessively, takes off her fake nose and wig, and makes out with John. Heather also gets drunk, while Destiney continues to make connection with Ace.

Back at the house, Heather is trying to sleep off her hangover and has an asthma attack. Lacey decides this would be time for some payback for when Heather yelled at Brandi C. when she was drunk. Brandi C., still very drunk, is convinced by Lacey to harass Heather. Destiney, Brandi M., and Kristy Joe try to get Brandi C. to stop yelling and try to get her out of the room. The confrontation ends with Brandi C. spitting in Destiney's face, and Lacey escorting Brandi C. out of the room. Heather talks to Lacey and Lacey brings up that Heather thinks she's an A-list Celebrity and Heather responses, "I am, bitch!" Heather, fed up with all the drama, talks to her mom on the phone, while Lacey continues to harass her. In frustration, Heather throws a plate at the wall, nearly hitting Lacey. The next day, Brandi C. doesn't remember what happened the previous night. After hearing from Jessica she spat in Destiney's face, Brandi C. talks to Destiney, apologizing for her actions. Destiney forgives her, but tells her that she needs to stop hanging with Lacey and to stop drinking. Heather has a private meeting with Sharon about what happened the night before, explaining that she was just angry and was just venting her anger, and didn't want to fight with anybody.

At elimination, Sharon lashes out at Lacey for instigating the fights in the house, and Lacey blames Heather for all of it, saying that Heather tried to throw the plate at her head on purpose and that she was only sticking up for her friend, Brandi C, because Heather yelled at Brandi C. Jessica says Heather threw the plate at the wall, not her head. When Lacey tries to interrupt her, Jessica says it's her time to talk, which impresses the judges, since Jessica is standing up for herself. Heather, growing flustered, tells the deans that Brandi C. spat in Destiney's face. Sharon tells Brandi C. that spitting is childish, against the law, and disgusting. Sharon asked Destiney if she wants Brandi C. to go home, and Destiney says that she would rather see Lacey go home, because Lacey always instigates. Sharon decides to eliminate Brandi C., expressing disappointment as she felt Brandi C. was improving. Riki says he thought she could have won the entire competition, and regrets having such a high opinion of her. Lacey realizes that she is now alone in the house, with all the other girls against her. Sharon continues to reprimand Lacey for instigating and riling people up.

- Challenge Winner: Brandi M.
- Bottom Three: N/A
- Expelled: Brandi C.

Reason For Elimination

- Brandi C. - Sharon expelled her after learning that she spit on Destiney.

=== Poetic Justice ===
First aired November 30, 2008

Lacey feels powerless for not having her friends with her, and feels she needs to start being nicer in order to stay on the show. This week, the six remaining contestants received lessons in anger management, and learned violence isn't the answer and yelling just makes it worse. Destiney and Lacey use sock puppets to reenact when Brandi C. spat in her face, and Destiney said it all felt awkward to her, since she hasn't played with puppets since she was five. Lacey and Heather reenact when Heather threw the plate at her and Lacey apologizes to Heather and wants to be friends again, and Heather slowly accepts. When asked if she had a problem with anybody in the house, Destiney said she didn't really understand why Kristy Joe was still there, and Kristy Joe got a little upset about it. The challenge is to write a song or poem about a girl in the house they had a problem with and whoever had the best would be safe from expulsion. Lacey tries to reach out to the girls and decides to work hard and win the challenge.

The next day, the girls arrive at a coffee house to perform. One of the judges is Ashwin Sood a record producer and actually drummed for Sarah McLachlan. Brandi M. goes first and her poem is about Lacey and does it good job with it. Destiney sang a song about Lacey, but was a bit aggressive with it. Kristy Joe performed her poem of Lacey with bongos, that ended up being very short. Jessica also wrote a poem about Lacey. Lacey sang a song about Heather about how badly Lacey screwed up and just wants to be her friend again, at which Lacey cried at the end, not realizing how much payback she was really putting the girls through. Heather wrote a poem about Jessica, saying she really didn't need to be there, and Jessica feels confused. In the end, Brandi M. ends up winning the challenge. On the bus, Heather continues to tell Jessica she's not a train wreck and she didn't need to be there like they did, and Jessica cries, feeling she was being attacked.

Back at the house, the girls receive a note from Sharon, saying they need to pick between Kristy Joe and Jessica who needs Charm School the least and to drop the results under her door. Jessica cries because all the other girls agree she doesn't need Charm School as bad as Kristy Joe does. At elimination, Jessica, Kristy Joe, and Lacey are brought down to the carpet. Lacey is scolded for showing no remorse, and then all of a sudden starts showing regrets and it makes the judges wonder if it's an act, Kristy Joe is there for not showing much improvement, and Jessica is there for being neutral. Sharon thinks Kristy Joe hasn't been showing much effort and expels her. Just when it seems elimination is over, Sharon tells Jessica that the girls voted for her and agrees that she no longer needs Charm School, and is expelled as well.

- Challenge Winner: Brandi M.
- Bottom Three: Jessica, Kristy Joe, Lacey
- Expelled: Kristy Joe, Jessica

Reason For Elimination

- Kristy Joe - Felt that she didn't put in much effort into Charm School.
- Jessica - The girls felt that Jessica didn't need Charm School as much as the others and Sharon agreed.

=== Battle of the Brands ===
First aired December 7, 2008

The final four girls learn how to correctly represent themselves, and use a pie chart that represents what means the most to them, and what means the least to them (Health, Family, Sex, Career, and Fun). When Destiney and Brandi M. make sex the least important, Heather calls them out for saying she doesn't think they're being honest, especially when Destiney picked up on guys on I Love Money, and that Brandi M. made a PSA of being slutty. Later on, Destiney and Heather argue and Destiney cries because she doesn't like Heather, who she thought was her friend, accusing her of being a liar. Heather now doesn't trust any of the other girls. The girls learn their next challenge is to brand themselves by creating an original T-shirt for designer Christian Audigier. Destiney feels this challenge is right up her alley and makes her shirt with a flying guitar on it, Brandi M. makes her shirt with an octopus on it to show how much she's grown as a person, Lacey makes her shirt about the environment, and Heather puts her face on her shirt to show how much she's changed since then. Heather's assistant's computer crashes and barely had enough time to finish the design.

Before the judging, Lacey tries to get Heather to talk with her and the other girls, but Heather says she feels the other girls are all against her. At judging, the judges are Christian Audigier, and Johnny Hallyday. Sharon narrows it down to Destiney and Brandi M.'s designs. In the end, she picks Destiney's and her design will be sold as a T-shirt nationwide. Back at the house, Heather cries on the phone to her friend and says she feels like quitting, but with her friend's cheering, Heather decides to stay. Before elimination, Heather speaks to Sharon and admits Brandi M. lied about being allergic to Megan's dog earlier, because she hates Megan. Sharon calls in the other girls and discusses their honesty and each girl comes clean and talks about their issue with Heather.

At elimination, Heather, Lacey, and Brandi M. are automatically called down to the carpet. Sharon discusses the fight going on with the girls and Heather explains she was just speaking her mind, and the judges tell her sometimes she needs to shut it. Lacey and Heather scream at each other and Heather accuses her of being fake. Sharon decides to put Heather out of her misery and expels her for her emotional problems, but says it wasn't easy, as she felt Heather was really improving. Lacey starts talking about how she has changed and starts expressing remorse for bullying and being mean to others, claiming "transformation", but Sharon tells her to stop while she's ahead, and that she doesn't believe Lacey has changed.

- Challenge Winner: Destiney
- Bottom Three: Brandi M., Heather, Lacey
- Expelled: Heather

Reason For Elimination

- Heather - Felt she had too many emotional problems.

=== Semester Review ===
First aired December 14, 2008

Highlights and outtakes from the season, including:

- Raven and Rodeo discussing what they wanted to get out of Charm School.
- Raven being antisocial, including not wanting to talk to and mooning Jessica, Megan, Lacey, and Brandi C.
- Lacey, Megan, and Brandi C. fighting with Brandi M. and Destiney about Brandi M. writing "Megan is a whore" on the chalkboard.
- Lacey hiding the stain stick from the girls to prevent them from cleaning their outfits.
- Lacey, Megan, and Brandi C. mockingly calling Destiney by her former stripping name, Stephanie.
- Extended footage of Megan kicking Brandi M.
- Extended scene of Brandi C.'s spitting incident.
- Heather having a heartfelt phone call with her mother after fighting with the girls.

=== Thou Shalt Be Fully Rockin' ===
First aired December 21, 2008

The final three girls learn all about charity and will have to go on the streets of Hollywood Boulevard to collect items such as pens, tampons, etc. from the people walking by and whoever gets the most profit from the items donated would be safe from expulsion. Because this challenge is tougher for one person, there's a twist to this challenge: each girl will be teamed up with their former enemy from the past. Lacey is paired up with Heather, Brandi M. is paired up with Megan, and Destiney is paired up with Brandi C. During the challenge, Megan cheats and puts the donated items in Lacey's basket instead of Brandi M.'s and when she gets caught, Brandi M. only puts some of the items in the correct basket, and realizes she's going to have to do all the work on her own. Megan also accepted many donated items and left them behind and only collected the cheapest item on the list, pens. Lacey and Heather start off strong, but after getting rejected by many of the people, Lacey yells at one lady, accusing her of not caring about homeless people and gains a lot of negative attention. Destiney and Brandi C. have a tough time gaining focus from the people and just let them walk by. When it comes time to see who had the most money, just when it seems as if Lacey wins, Brandi M. wins and will be safe from expulsion, much to the dismay of Megan.

At elimination, Lacey and Destiney are called down and the judges scorn Lacey for resorting back to her evil ways and is taking all her passionate anger on strangers. Destiney is scolded for not being open enough to get donations from the public. Destiney points out that she didn't scream at anyone the way Lacey did, and Lacey argues that she was passionate about a challenge that helped others, while Destiney seemed more passionate about the T-shirt challenge, which only benefited herself. Based on who is changing the most, Lacey is expelled for going back to Evil Lacey and for not accepting the fact that everybody is different and have different beliefs, not what Lacey believes in. Lacey defends her actions, by saying that if she sees people not caring about homeless people, she will always show them the "Evil Lacey". She also mentions that she will always hate Dallas, in reference to her rivalry with Dallas.

The next day, Brandi M. and Destiney receive a note that they have to write a speech on why they deserve to win. Later, the girls are invited to Sharon's mansion for lunch for some time with Sharon and tell her what they would do with the prize money. Destiney wants to go to school for fashion designing and open a bar, while Brandi M. listens intensely to Sharon explaining how she and husband Ozzy fell in love and yet they had nothing, but eventually got out of their slump and got rich and successful again. Back at the mansion, Destiney writes her speech quickly while Brandi M. struggles writing her speech. Before elimination, Brandi M. and Destiney find that Sharon has bought them beautiful dresses, shoes, and accessories for them to wear.

At the final elimination, Destiney gives her speech first. In her speech, Destiney admits on her time of Rock Of Love 2, she was trying to be cool and after her father died, it made her rethink of life and realize how precious life is and knows she needed to change and took this opportunity to learn and feels she now knows her direction her life and wants to go to school for fashion designing. Brandi M. begins reciting her speech on paper that she has fought so hard to stay on the show, and then rips up her speech and says she knows who she is as a person now and feels nobody is going to put her down anymore and feel depressed about it, and says she loves herself more. Sharon is incredibly torn between both girls. Sharon tearfully approaches both girls and finally gives the $100,000 check to Brandi M. saying she had her when she ripped up her speech and spoke from her heart. Brandi M. emotionally breaks down and is shocked she won. Daniella then gives Destiney an opportunity to work with her on her clothing line.

- Challenge Assistants: Heather, Megan, and Brandi C.
- Challenge Winner: Brandi M.
- Bottom Two: Destiney, Lacey
- Expelled: Lacey
- Final Two: Brandi M., Destiney
- Runner-Up: Destiney
- Winner: Brandi M.

Reason For Elimination

- Lacey - Sharon expelled her after she returned to her "evil ways" and couldn't accept the fact that there were people with different points of view than hers.
- Destiney - Was the runner-up.

=== Reunion ===
First aired January 4, 2009

All the girls, except Raven, attended the reunion, which was hosted by Riki. Angelique is called down first and talks about not doing any more porn and is filming a "scary movie." Kristy Joe was not present with the other girls, until Riki tells the audience she wanted to show the world what she has learned. She comes out wearing the fat suit from the speed dating episode, and explains she doesn't judge people by their appearance anymore. She is working on her emotional problems and her personality for when she starts dating again.

Megan is brought up to talk, and is asked if she is drunk because of her strange behavior. However, when asked about it, she responds, "Why would I be drunk? It's the afternoon!" Megan admits she was satisfied leaving early because she thinks she's "perfect" and does not need Charm School. Rodeo is brought up to discuss her issues with Megan. Rodeo says she feels sorry for Megan because she has to promote herself on television by "using her face", showing off her body, and having to manipulate to get her way. Rodeo is doing more entrepreneurship, this time selling unisex, waterproof jeans. Megan says any type of product with Rodeo's face on it would not sell and says Rodeo is old and wearing the jeans would be good for her because then she wouldn't need to wear diapers. Megan then randomly brings up that her dog, Lily, couldn't be here because she had an operation to get her "lady parts removed" and Sharon suggests Megan should do the same saying that one of her is enough for any country and that she should not be allowed to breed. Megan responds with some remarks concerning her husband. Sharon then grabs her drink and pours it on Megan. Many security guards enter the scene to separate Megan and Sharon. Megan is then escorted out of the building with Brandi C. following her. Sharon states, "When you fuck with me, I don't give a shit, but not with my family." The crowd cheers and many contestants run up to Sharon to hug her and praise her for her actions.

After the commercial break, Lacey talks about her bullying or taunting the other girls for amusement. She explains that there's a difference between pissing other people off and hurting someone else's feelings. After a while, what Sharon said began to sink in and started to go easy. Dallas is brought down first and she expresses disbelief towards Lacey's supposed transformation, and says she may have won by getting under her skin, but she still didn't win Charm School. Heather is then brought down and Lacey surprises Heather with a shirt that says "A-list Celebrity", a quote Heather said to Lacey in Episode 7. Sharon points out to Heather that even she herself is a B-list Celebrity. Riki shows a clip of Heather talking to her manager and stylist and who barely got on the reunion. After the shows' producers try to explain to Heather that no one besides the contestants and crowd are allowed into the building, Heather replies, "Well I'm not everybody." Heather explains she just has a great production team, including Anna Nicole Smith's stylist.

Destiney explains she didn't take Daniella's generous offer to work with her, but, however, she is working on a clothing line called "Divination" and is wearing a jacket she designed. She gives samples to Riki, Sharon, Daniella, and even the audience. Brandi M. comes down, with new brown hair, and explains that she still hasn't received the prize check, but when she does, she will donate some of it to Destiney's father's liver cancer foundation, and is going to get a boob job and is going to take Destiney with her to Hawaii. The show ends with the audience still clapping for Brandi M.

==== Fight and lawsuit ====
According to the Los Angeles Times, Osbourne was being investigated for assaulting Megan after she described Ozzy Osbourne as a "brain-dead rock star" during the taping.

In March, Megan filed a suit against Osbourne in Los Angeles court claiming battery, negligence and intentional infliction of emotional distress as a result of a December incident during the taping of the Charm School reunion.

== Spin-offs ==
- I Love Money 2 features contestants from Rock of Love with Bret Michaels, I Love New York, Real Chance of Love, and Flavor of Love competing in different challenges for a cash prize.
- Megan Wants a Millionaire featured Megan Hauserman in her own dating show spin-off, with Brandi Cunnigham participating as well. The show was cancelled after three episodes due to controversy involving one of the contestants, Ryan Jenkins, in the murder of Jasmine Fiore after the show was taped.

== After the Show ==
Angelique appeared on I Love Money 2, coming in 6th.

Lacey appeared on the cancelled I Love Money 3, where she is believed to have finished in sixth place.

Megan and Brandi C. appeared on Megan Wants a Millionaire, but was cancelled mid season.

Brandi C, Rodeo, Heather, Destiney, Kristy Joe, Megan, Angelique, and Lacey appeared on Rock of Love Girls: Where Are They Now?

Jessica and Destiney appeared on "Hole In The Wall" Rock of Love VS Flavor of Love, where they were against Flavor of Love stars Pumkin, Saaphyri, and Buckwild.

Rock of Love Bus (Rock of Love 3) Began to air in 2009.

Sharon Osbourne said on the March 6, 2018 episode of The Talk (which she co-hosts) that she hated doing the show, solely doing it for the money.
