= Reality Horror Night =

- Directed by: Douglas Elford Argent
- Screenplay by: Douglas Elford Argent; Nicholas Mark Harding
- Story by: Sean Pomper
- Produced by: Karen Katz; Neal Bellin; Gregg Luckman; Seth Zuckerman
- Release date: October 31, 2009
- Running time: 80 minutes
- Country: United States
- Language: English

Reality Horror Night is a 2009 horror comedy film created by Sean Pomper and directed by Douglas Elford Argent who wrote it with Nicholas Mark Harding. The film features mostly reality stars who portray themselves on a twisted new reality show. It was filmed in Glen Cove, New York at the Glen Cove Mansion. The film was released on October 31, 2009.

== Plot ==
The cast enters a mansion to compete on a new reality show for $1 million but with an unexpected twist. Mysteriously, a cast member disappears but without a formal elimination ceremony. When more and more castmates start disappearing in this fashion it is up to the remaining cast to discover how this game is really played.

== Cast ==
- Matthew Underwood
- Destiney Moore
- Erik Chopin
- Gina Lynn
- Paul Grassi
- Billy Garcia
- Cathy Nardone
- Angelique Morgan
- Elizabeth Gasinski
- Gary Garver
- Joseph Gannascoli
- Danielle Dipietro
- Robert Smith
- Jason Prager
- David Frank Fletcher Jr.
