= Taya Parker =

American exotic model, actress (born 1978)

Laurie Anne Maria Mull
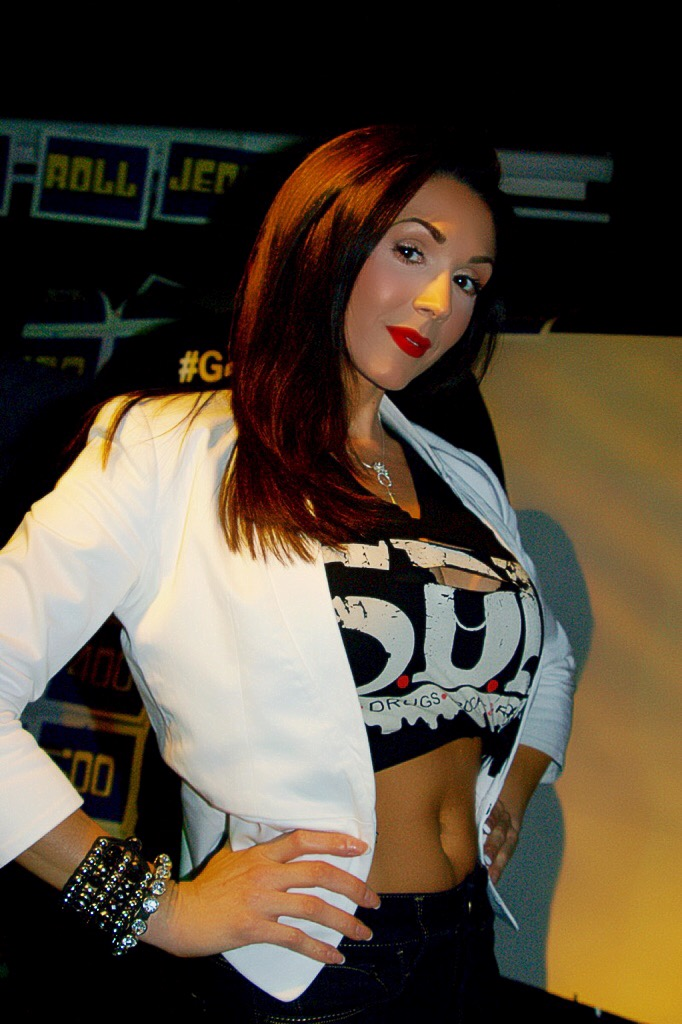
- Parker in 2016
- Born: January 10, 1978 (age 48); Marion, Ohio, United States
- Other name: Taya Parker
- Occupations: Exotic dancer, actress
- Known for: Rock of Love Bus with Bret Michaels; 2009 Penthouse Pet
- Children: 1

Laurie Anne Maria Mull, better known as; Taya Parker is an American reality television star, and model. Best known for winning VH1's reality show Rock of Love Bus with Bret Michaels. She was also the 2009 Penthouse Pet of the year.

== Modeling career ==
Exotic Dancer magazine awarded Parker as their 2007 entertainer of the year in Las Vegas, Nevada. English entertainment reporter and writer Robin Leach, reviewed and featured Parker's work several times in the Las Vegas Weekly newspaper.

In 2009 she was the Penthouse Pet of the year. In the spring of 2014 Parker was the centerfold model and featured in a 12-page pictorial for the exclusive lifestyle entertainment magazine for men, Bizsu.

== Television career ==
In 2009 Parker was a contestant on VH1's hit celebreality series Rock of Love Bus with Bret Michaels. Parker won the show and briefly dated Bret Michaels after show finished filming.

Parker made an appearance on Larry King Live, and hosted one segment of the television show Out n About. She also made a guest appearance on the American radio show The Opie and Anthony Show.

== Personal life ==
Parker and Bret Michaels dated briefly after winning his celebreality series; Rock of Love Bus.

== Filmography ==
Year	Title	Role	Notes
2002	Small Town Girls	Self	
2005	Zdenka & Friends	Self	Direct-to-video
2007	Penthouse Presents: Gina and Friends	Self	Direct-to-video
2008	Redemption Song	Self, contestant	Reality TV series, 1 episode
2008	Howard TV	Self	1 episode
2009	Rock of Love Bus with Bret Michaels	Self, contestant	Reality TV series, winner (season 3)
2009	The Opie and Anthony Show	Self, guest	1 episode
2009	Behind the Music	Self	1 episode
2010	Larry King Live	Self, guest	2 episodes
2013	Pro Wrestlers vs Zombies	Taya Parker	
2016	You Found Me	Stacy Phelps	
2016	Out n About	Host	1 episode
2016	Knocking on Heaven's Door	Scarlett	Filmed in 2016, unreleased

1970s	Evelyn Treacher	Stephanie McLean	Tina McDowall	Patricia Barrett	Avril Lund
1970s	Anneka Di Lorenzo	Laura Bennett Doone	Victoria Lynn Johnson	Dominique Maure	Cheryl Rixon
1980s	Isabella Ardigo	Danielle Deneux	Corinne Alphen	Sheila Kennedy	Linda Kenton
1980s	None	Cody Carmack	Mindy Farrar	Patty Mullen	Ginger Miller
1990s	Stephanie Page	Simone Brigitte	Jisel	Julie Strain	Sasha Vinni
1990s	Gina LaMarca	Andi Sue Irwin	Elizabeth Ann Hilden	Paige Summers	Nikie St. Gilles
2000s	Juliet Cariaga	Zdeňka Podkapová	Megan Mason	Sunny Leone	Victoria Zdrok
2000s	Martina Warren	Jamie Lynn	Heather Vandeven	Erica Ellyson	Taya Parker
2010s	Taylor Vixen	Nikki Benz	Jenna Rose	Nicole Aniston	Lexi Belle
2010s	Layla Sin	Kenna James	Jenna Sativa	Gina Valentina	Gianna Dior
2020s	Lacy Lennon	Kenzie Anne	Amber Marie	Tahlia Paris	Renee Olstead
2020s	Kassie Wallis	-	-	-	-
