= Foursome (2006 TV series) =

- Country of origin: United States

Production
- Running time: 30 mins

Original release
- Network: Playboy TV
- Release: 2006 – 2011

Foursome (promoted as Playboy's Foursome) is an adult reality dating series, which ran for five seasons on Playboy TV.

== Premise ==
Based on similar reality dating game shows of the early 2000s like Blind Date and The 5th Wheel, Foursome gathers four singles, two men and two women, and bases them in a Los Angeles (and, in some later episodes, New York City or Miami) mansion for 24 hours. Throughout the experience daters are introduced, profiled, and made to participate in erotic activities both in the mansion and off-site.

Playmates and models generally instigate the first round sexually oriented party games, followed by "field trips" to Hollywood clubs, massage parlors, or trendy bars. What transpires between the participants varies depending on factors such as chemistry. In some episodes, they may engage in one or more sexual encounters; in others, they may go to bed separately without doing so; occasionally, a participant may be so dissatisfied that he or she leaves the mansion early. Participants also occasionally "hook up" with the facilitators of the various activities in lieu of or in addition to their fellow residents.

Notable singles from past seasons include various reality stars such as; Bad Girls Club season 5 Miami cast member Erica Langston, Big Brother 11 contestants Braden Bacha and Michele Noonan, Flavor of Love season 1 contestant Brooke "Pumkin" Thompson, I Love New York season 1 contestants Jason "Heat" Rosell and Sandro "Rico" Padrone, Jenna's American Sex Star contestant Diana Prince, Masterchef season 6 contestant Derrick Fox, Rock of Love with Bret Michaels season 1 contestant Tawny Amber Young, Rock of Love with Bret Michaels season 2 contestant Angelique 'Frenchy' Morgan, longtime Survivor contestant Ozzy Lusth, and The Real World: Sydney cast member Dunbar Flinn. However, a majority of the contestants consisted of pornography actors and actresses.

== Season 2 and beyond ==
In 2008, Foursome returned for a second season, featuring a new mansion and slightly updated format. In some episodes, facilitators and other special guests end up having sex with participants, leading to friction among some daters.

In September 2009, Playboy TV premiered a third season of the series, with cameras going to homes in Las Vegas, San Francisco, and Miami.

In September 2010, Playboy TV announced the fourth season of the series which takes place in New York City and Los Angeles. A fifth season aired in 2011.

Beginning in the second season, the level of sexual explicitness increased in the series, with penetration and other sexual acts shown uncensored. As noted below, this resulted in the DVD release of season 2 being edited to remove such content.

== DVD releases ==
As of spring 2010, season 1 has been released to DVD in region 1 over two volumes, with a single-volume season 2 release. The second season DVD is censored to remove explicit footage from the original broadcasts.

== Foursome: Walk of Shame ==
This spinoff goes back to the original series with guest star comedians giving their insights to the ongoings in the show. This series ran for two seasons from February 2, 2013 until April 19, 2014.
