= Angelique Morgan =

French pornographic actress (born 1975)

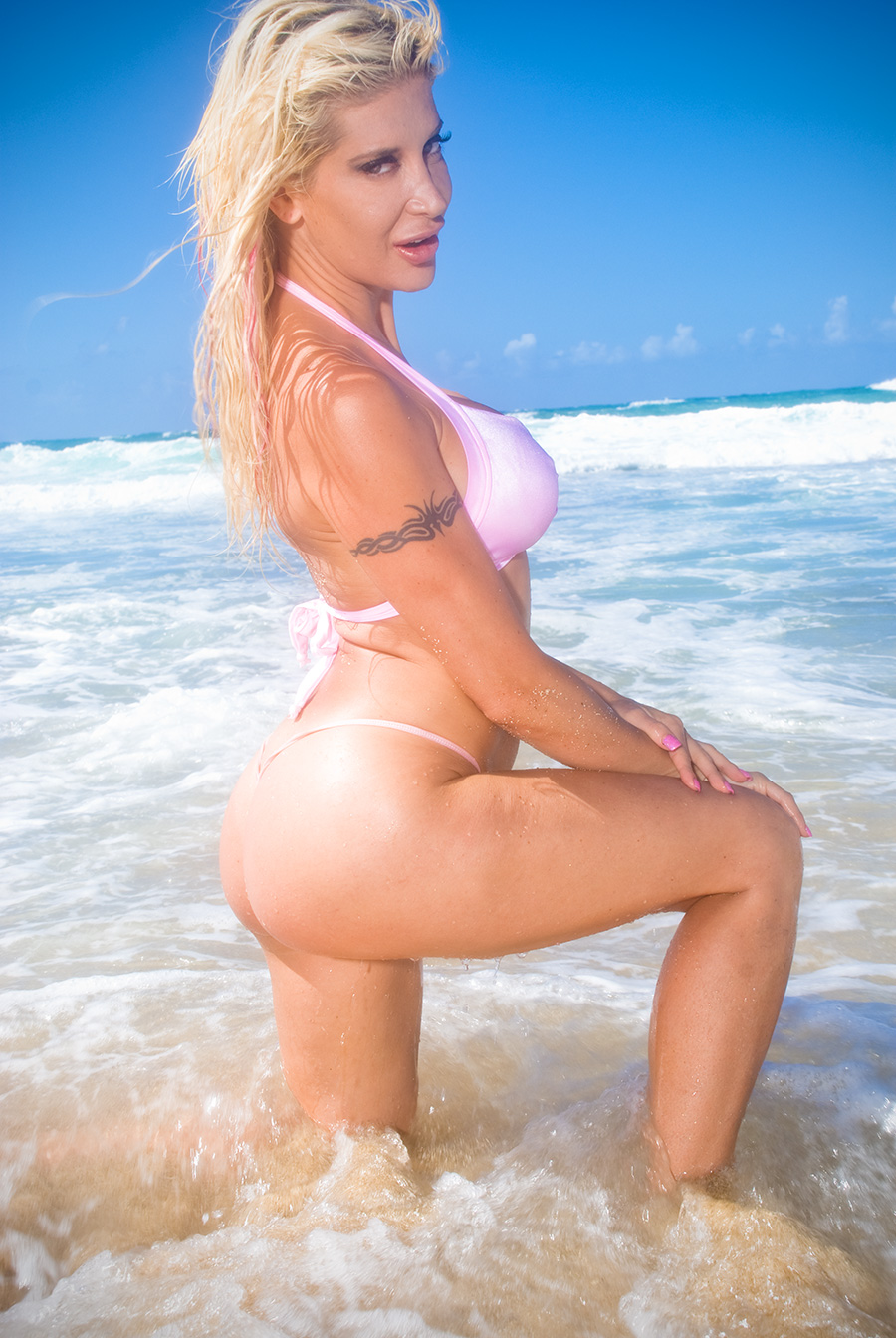
- Morgan in 2008
- Born: Angelique Morgan; 22 September 1975 (age 51); Paris, France
- Other name: Frenchy
- Occupations: Pornographic film actress, reality television star
- Television: Rock of Love with Bret Michaels season 2, Celebrity Big Brother UK
- Height: 5 ft 0 in (1.52 m)

Angelique Morgan (born 22 September 1975), sometimes nicknamed Frenchy, is a French pornographic actress and reality television star. She is best known for her appearances on the hit VH1 celebreality series Rock of Love with Bret Michaels season 2, Rock of Love: Charm School and I Love Money season 2. She was also a contestant on the fourteenth series of Celebrity Big Brother UK.

== Pornography career ==
Morgan appeared in porn films starting in 2006, with her first appearance being in Bang Bros productions, until 2010. Morgan sometimes worked under the name Angelique Jorgan, with this name first being used in the 2006 Club Jenna productions film, MILF School 2. She starred in Gina Lynn's 2007 film Filthy Ho's 4.

Morgan began working as a stripper in a gentleman's club in London after quitting her job as a receptionist. She moved to Miami to continue working as a stripper full time. In 2004, Morgan moved to Las Vegas, Nevada, where she continued stripping and made regular appearances on Playboy TV.

She also worked as a nude model.

In 2018, Morgan starred in the burlesque magic show Le Magique Fantastique at Bally's Las Vegas Hotel & Casino.

== Television career ==
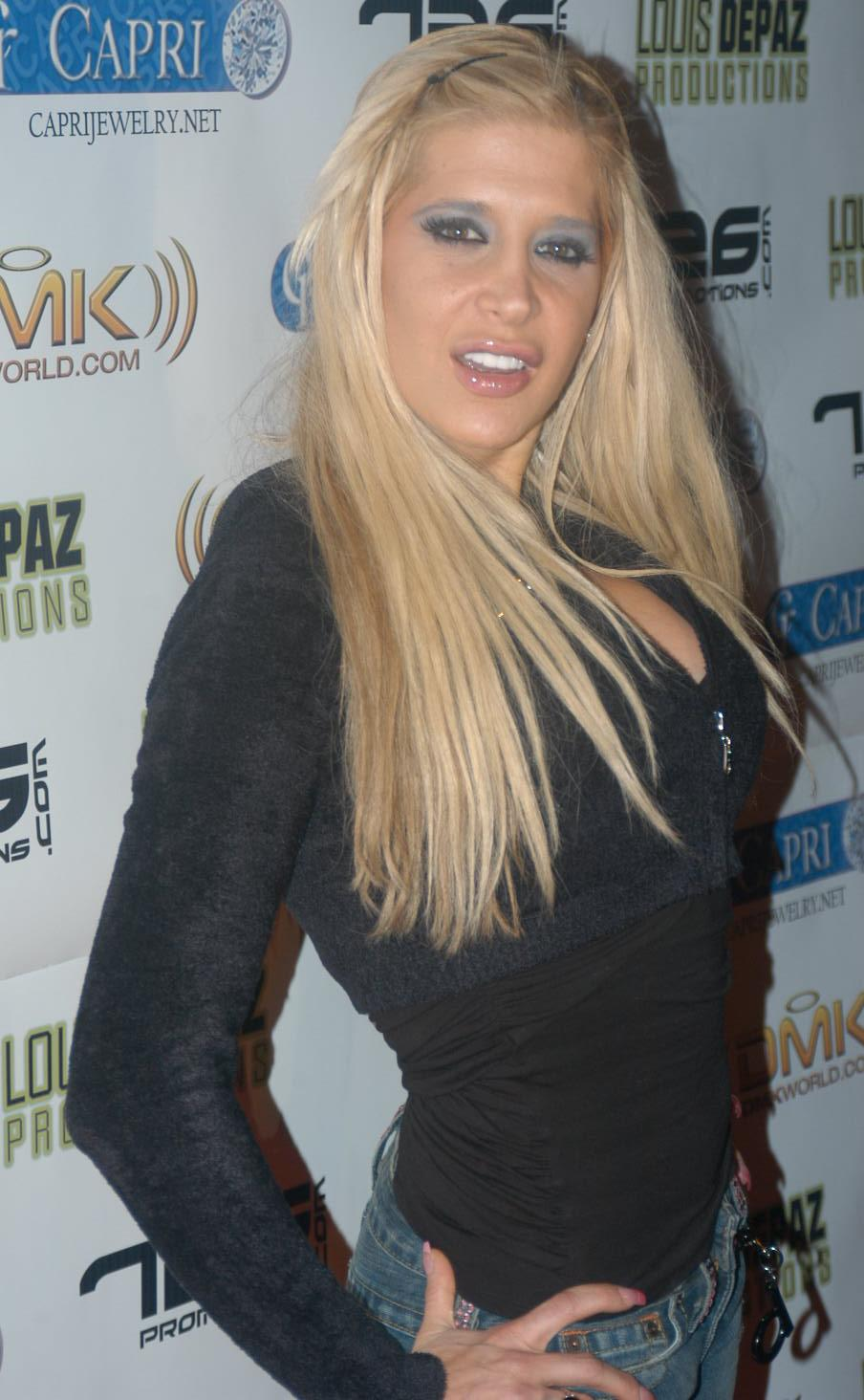
Angelique Morgan in 2005.

Morgan appeared on an episode of Dr. 90210 in 2006. She also appeared on Howard TV between 2006-2008. In 2007, she appeared in an episode of Criss Angel Mindfreak as an assistant to a magic trick.

In 2008, Morgan appeared on the VH1 hit celebreality series Rock of Love with Bret Michaels season 2.

She appeared on the VH1 celebreality spin off Charm School: Rock of Love with Sharon Osbourne. Morgan was eliminated in the second episode placing twelfth.

In 2009, Morgan starred in the VH1 celebreality spin off I Love Money season 2. She placed sixth and featured in fourteen episodes. Also in 2009, Morgan featured in the horror comedy Reality Horror Night playing herself.

In 2011, Morgan appeared in the documentary film Stripped, a documentary that chronicles the making of photographer Greg Friedler's book; Naked Las Vegas. The official website for the book featured a photoshoot with Morgan, some photos of her clothed, some with her nude.

In 2011, Morgan began hosting for blogtalkradio.com, an online radio station.

In 2014, Morgan took part in the fourteenth series of Celebrity Big Brother UK. Morgan's time on the show was controversial. Due to her controversial time on the show, Morgan became the second most googled celebrity in the United Kingdom in 2014.

== Filmography ==
=== Film and television ===
Year	Title	Role	Notes
2004-2006	Playboy TV	Self	Recurring guest
2006	Dr. 90210	Self	1 episode
2006	Foursome	Self; host	1 episode
2006	The Playboy Mansion	Self	1 episode
2006-2008	Howard TV	Self	3 episodes
2007	Criss Angel Mindfreak	Self	1 episode
2008	Rock of Love with Bret Michaels season 2	Self; contestant	11th place, 4 episodes
2008	Rock of Love: Charm School	Self; contestant	12th place, 4 episodes
2008	Sudden Impact	Extra	1 episode
2009	I Love Money season 2	Self; contestant	6th place, 14 episodes
2009	Sexiest Women of Reality TV Swimsuit Calendar Edition	Self; model	TV special
2009	Reality Horror Night	Frenchy	
2010	Rock of Love Girls: Where Are They Now?	Self	TV special
2011	Stripped	Self	Documentary
2012	I Married A Mobster	Prostitute #1	1 episode
2014	The Playboy Morning Show	Self	1 episode
2014	Celebrity Big Brother UK Series 14	Self; housemate	11th place, 19 episodes
2014	Celebrity Big Brother: Bit on The Side	Self; ex-housemate	4 episodes
2014	Celebrity Big Brother: Bit on The Psych	Self; ex-housemate	TV special
2014	16th Minute	Self; guest	1 episode
2014-2017	The Jimmy Star Show with Ron Russell	Self; guest	3 episodes
2016-2017	Botched	Self	3 episodes
2016	Dead Maker	Jeanette	
2017-2019	Gown and Out Beverly Hills	Self	3 episodes
2018	Teen Mom OG	Self; guest	1 episode
2019	Dr. Phil	Self; guest	1 episode
2020	Hooked on the Look	Self	1 episode
2024	Addicted to Fame	Self	1 episode

=== Pornography Films ===
Year	Title	Role	Notes
2006	MILF Lessons	Self; actress	
2006	MILF School 2	Self; actress	Credited as Angelique Jorgan
2006	Lesbian Mature Women 12	Self; actress	
2006	Jacq of All Trades	Self; actress	
2006	Mom Shopping	Self; actress	
2006	Double Air Bags 19	Self; actress	
2006	Housewife Bangers: Angelique	Self; actress	
2006	Delivery No. 84, Customer: Angelique	Self; actress	
2006	French Cougar Plays Hotel Whore	Self; actress	
2007	French Foreign Chick Masturbates in Bed	Self; actress	
2007	360 Solos	Self; actress	
2007	Filthy Ho's 4	Self; actress	
2007	Limo Bimbo's 4	Self; actress	
2007	Big Sausage Pizza 14	Self; actress	
2008	Fudgestick 3	Self; actress	
2010	Desperate MILFs and Housewives 10	Self; actress	
2010	Paste My Face 15	Self; actress	

=== Web series ===
Year	Title	Role	Notes
2014	I Wanna Get Naked!	Self, executive producer	
2016	Frenchy Mafia	Self, executive producer	
2016	Rising Star	Self, executive producer	
2017	Stripperland	Self, executive producer	
2018	Frenchy World	Self, executive producer	
2019	Korealand	Self, executive producer	
