= Nicholas Mark Harding =

Nicholas Mark Harding (born 1964 in London) is an author and British screenwriter who has written for film, television, magazines, newspapers and computer games. He is also a published poet and short story writer. He is the author of the cult classic and critically acclaimed How to Start Your Own Secret Society. He has appeared on ITV’s This Morning, has been a contributor to TV documentaries on secret societies including one for Channel 4 and has made over fifty appearances for both local and national BBC radio.

He co-wrote The Notebooks of Cornelius Crow, shown in Cannes in 2004, and Folie a Deux, premièred at the Maine International Film Festival in 2012, with director Sean Martin. He is active in the Mendip Caving scene and was a co-discoverer of the Lost Cave of Loxton made famous by Alexander Catcott, Axbridge Hill Cavern and Upper Canada Cave in Hutton near Weston super Mare. He is a member of the Axbridge Caving Group. He is an atheist, skeptic and a registered Bright.

He was one of the interviewees on BBC Radio 4's Weston's New Pier presented by Chris Ledgard. His novel Sunsphere, a tongue in cheek historical conspiracy, was published in 2011. He was co-writer of The Way Out, winner of a 2020 Royal Television Society award, starring Omid Jalili and Blaithin Mac Gabhann, directed by Suri Krishnamma, for BBC4, The Arts Council and Battersea Arts Centre. He is currently developing film and television projects.

== Books ==
- "Urban Legends" 2004 (ISBN 1-904048-35-8)
- "Secret Societies" 2005 (ISBN 1-904048-41-2)
- "How to Start Your Own Secret Society" 2006 Paperback (ISBN 1-904048-84-6) Hardback 2007 (ISBN 978-1-84243-211-2)
- "How To Be A Good Atheist" 2007 (ISBN 978-1-84243-237-2)
- "How To Be A Good Atheist" Audio Version 2009 (ISBN 978-1-906968-12-0)
- "Sunsphere" 2011 (ISBN 978-0-9555230-5-2)

== Journalism ==
- "Here's the Whisper on Secret Societies" - The Daily Express December 2006
- "Secret Societies" ICE Magazine no: 48 2005
- "Tunnel Vision" ICE Magazine no: 53 2006

== Computer Games ==
- "Crime Life - Gang Wars" Konami 2005

== Filmography as screenwriter ==
- "Meeting a Bullet" (2004) A New York crime drama
- "25%" (2005) A Los Angeles crime drama
- "The Notebooks of Cornelius Crow" (2005), a psychological thriller set in London
- "Reality Horror Night" (2008) Comedy Horror set in a hotel.
- "Brazen Bull" (2009)
- "Folie a Deux" (2012) A story about an online date with a secret.
- "Isolated" (2020)
- "The Way Out" (2020)
