= Rock of Love Bus with Bret Michaels =

2009 season of American television series

- The Cast of Rock of Love Bus (3 not pictured)
- Created by: Cris Abrego; Mark Cronin
- Directed by: Matt Bordofsky
- Starring: Bret Michaels
- Country of origin: United States
- No. of episodes: 13

Production
- Executive producers: Cris Abrego; Mark Cronin; Ben Samek; For VH1: Leah Horwitz; Jill Holmes; Kristen Kelly; Jeff Olde
- Cinematography: Brian Steimle
- Running time: 90 minutes (Premiere); 60 minutes (including commercials)
- Production companies: 51 Minds Entertainment; VH1

Original release
- Network: VH1
- Release: January 4 – April 19, 2009

Related
- Rock of Love 2; Charm School with Ricki Lake; I Love Money 4

Rock of Love Bus with Bret Michaels is the third season of Rock of Love with Bret Michaels and was confirmed by VH1's website in a blog on July 16, 2008. In the show, eligible women live on tour buses and travel with Bret Michaels, competing for his attention and affection. The show premiered on January 4, 2009. On December 29, 2008, it was announced Rock of Love Bus would be the final Rock of Love.

== Production and legal problems ==
On September 28, 2008, a truck driven by a roadie hauling equipment for Rock of Love Bus, caused a deadly accident when the driver fell asleep at the wheel. The truck crossed over the median and into oncoming traffic on Interstate 57 near West Frankfort, Illinois. The truck hit a pickup truck and a sports-utility vehicle. The two 19-year-old college students in the sports-utility vehicle were killed, and the two individuals in the pickup truck were seriously injured. The driver was charged with driving with a suspended license and moving violations. No other Rock of Love employees or crew were involved. According to a statement by VH1, Michaels asked that production be temporarily suspended.

== Contestants ==
Name	Age	Hometown	Eliminated
Taya Parker	31	Marion, Ohio	Winner
Mindy Hall	35	Walnut Hills, Ohio	Episode 12
Jamie Ross	Unknown	Waterloo, Ontario	Episode 11
Beverly Palmer	30	Canton, Georgia	Episode 10
Ashley Klarich	23	Las Vegas, Nevada	Episode 9^{[a]}
Brittanya O'Campo	24	Oxnard, California	Episode 9
Farrah Sinclair	32	Monticello, Kentucky	Episode 8
Kelsey Bateman †	21	Sandy, Utah	Episode 7
Kami Samargis-Brossard	28	Clayton, Washington	Episode 7^{[k]}
Jennifer "Jenny" Beitzel	22	Northville, Michigan	Episode 6
Natasha McCollum	Unknown	Cincinnati, Ohio	Episode 5
Marcia "Brazil" Alves	30	Brazil/Las Vegas, Nevada	Episode 4
Maria Bock	40	Chicago, Illinois	Episode 4^{[m]}
Brittaney Starr	29	Henderson, Nevada	Episode 3
Melissa Martinez	29	Westwood, Ohio	Episode 3
Constandina Savvenas	38	Johnson City, Tennessee	Episode 2
Megan Tomczak	31	Universal City, California	Episode 2
Samantha Bengston	Unknown	Davenport, Iowa	Episode 2
Nikki "DJ Lady Tribe" Shamdasani	31	Cerritos, California	Episode 1
Gia Lynn	Unknown	Honolulu, Hawaii	Episode 1
Stephanie Farris	21	Kingston, Pennsylvania	Episode 1
Heather Mariscal	34	Summerville, South Carolina	Episode 1
Marciela "Marci" Mendoza	38	Los Angeles, California	Episode 1

== Elimination order ==
Bret's Call-out Order
#	Contestants	Episodes											
#	Contestants	1	2	3	4	5	6	7	8	9	10	11	12
1	Ashley	Ashley	**Brittanya**	Kelsey	**Ashley**	Jennifer	Taya	Ashley	Ashley	Mindy	Taya	Mindy	Taya
2	Beverly	Beverly	**Taya**	Natasha	**Natasha**	Kami	Mindy	Beverly	Jamie	Jamie	Jamie	Taya	Mindy
3	Brittaney	Brittanya	**Natasha**	Farrah	Farrah	Jamie	Kami	Brittanya	Mindy	Taya	Mindy	Jamie	
4	Brittanya	Constandina	Farrah	Ashley	**Kelsey**	Ashley	Beverly	Farrah	Brittanya	Beverly	Beverly		
5	Constandina	Farrah	Ashley	Taya	Taya	Mindy	Jamie	Jamie	Beverly	Ashley^{[a]}			
6	Farrah	Kelsey	Kelsey	Brittanya	**Brittanya**	Taya	Ashley	Mindy	Taya	Brittanya			
7	Gia	Maria	Beverly	Maria	Mindy	Beverly	Farrah	Taya	Farrah				
8	Heather	Megan	Mindy	Mindy	**Beverly**	Kelsey	Kelsey	Kelsey					
9	Jamie	Melissa	Maria	Marcia	**Marcia**	Farrah	Brittanya	Kami^{[k]}					
10	Jennifer	Mindy	Brittaney	Beverly	Maria^{[m]}	Brittanya	Jennifer						
11	Kami	Natasha	Marcia	Brittaney		Natasha							
12	Kelsey	Samantha	Melissa	Melissa									
13	Marcia	Taya	Constandina										
14	Marci	Marcia	Megan										
15	Maria	Brittaney	Samantha										
16	Megan	Nikki											
17	Melissa	Gia											
18	Mindy	Stephanie											
19	Natasha	Heather											
20	Nikki	Marci											
21	Samantha												
22	Stephanie												
23	Taya												

- Contestants in **bold** indicates that they received V.I.P. Access/Passes.

The contestant won the competition.
The contestant won a solo date with Bret.
The contestant won a group date with Bret.
The contestant was eliminated.
The contestant was going to receive a pass, but was eliminated.
The contestant won a date with Bret, but was eliminated.
The contestant won a date with Bret, but was eliminated before the elimination ceremony began.
The contestant voluntarily withdrew from the competition.
The contestant was added by Bret in Episode 5.

- In Episode 1, Bret did not have a call-out order. Names are listed in alphabetical order since he called out the bottom seven first while the rest of the girls got on the bus for the next stop.
- ^{^[m]} In Episode 4, Maria was forced to withdraw from the competition for medical reasons.
- In Episode 5, upon announcing the new girls are safe, Bret said "Detroit" (Jenny), "Spo-Kami" (Kami), and "Brooklyn" (Jamie) were all safe.
- In Episodes 5–6, even though the voiceover listed her name as "Jennifer" she was known as "Jenny" to the cast and Bret.
- ^{^[k]} In Episode 7, Kami decided she wasn't ready for Bret's lifestyle and left the tour. Names are listed in alphabetical order since Kelsey was called down first and was eliminated.
- ^{^[a]} In Episode 9, Bret had Ashley's pass in his hand ready to give to her, but first asked her where she stood with her ex. After Ashley hesitates, Bret decided to end her tour.
- In Episode 11, all of the girls went on a date with Bret.

== Episodes ==
=== Hustle on the Bustle ===
First aired January 4, 2009 (2.1M viewers)

Michaels takes the show on the road. As he tours, a second bus brings along the women vying for his attention. The contest is specifically engineered to reflect the challenges of life on the road.

- City: Louisville, Kentucky
- Bottom 7: Brittaney, Gia, Heather, Marcia, Marci, Nikki, Stephanie
- Eliminated: Gia, Heather, Marci, Nikki, Stephanie

Elimination Reasons

- Gia: Gia was too crazy and Bret didn't think there was much else besides a party girl there.
- Heather: Bret thought life on the road would be too crazy for her.
- Marci: Marci had not spoken to Bret at all.
- Nikki: Nikki had taken a shot out of Gia's genitals as well as several other raunchy antics.
- Stephanie: Stephanie had not spoken to Bret at all.

=== Fifteen Weddings and Three Funerals ===
First aired January 11, 2009

After all 15 recite their wedding vows, three girls must stay behind.

- City: Greenfield, Indiana
- Challenge: Wedding Vows
- Challenge Winners: Brittanya, Taya, Farrah
- Bottom 6: Brittaney, Constandina, Marcia, Megan, Melissa, Samantha
- Eliminated: Constandina, Megan, Samantha

Elimination Reasons

- Constandina: Constandina had previously told Bret that she had taken a religious vow of abstinence and would not have "all the way sex" for years.
- Megan: Megan gave Bret stuffed animals during the challenge, which didn't appeal to him.
- Samantha: She was very nervous and stumbled her words during the wedding vow challenge. It was also hinted that she wasn't confident or noticeable enough.

=== It's Babes on Ice ===
First aired January 18, 2009

There's a chill in the air as the 12 remaining contestants vie on ice against University of Illinois Women's Hockey [Club] and special guest player, Lacey. Tempers catch fire when one of the contestants is accused of secretly calling a boyfriend.

- City: Danville, Illinois
- Guest: Lacey Conner
- Challenge: Baby Hockey
- Challenge Winners: Beverly, Brittaney, Maria, Melissa
- Bottom 3: Beverly, Brittaney, Marcia
- Eliminated: Brittaney, Melissa

Elimination Reasons

- Brittaney: Bret felt that she was too needy and emotional for him to handle, and had a history of stealing socks.
- Melissa: Melissa had disrespected Bret by calling her boyfriend and saying bad things about him. She later denied even having a cell phone on her.

=== Roadies ===
First aired January 25, 2009

The ten remaining girls play roadie, racing to clear the stage. Winners get better seats at Michaels' concert.

- City: Chicago, Illinois
- Challenge: Roadie Challenge Test
- Challenge Winners: Ashley, Brittanya, Beverly, Natasha
- Bottom 3: Beverly, Marcia, Mindy
- Withdrew: Maria
- Eliminated: Marcia

Elimination Reasons

- Maria: Maria had a medical condition and had to be rushed to the hospital between episodes.
- Marcia: Bret didn't have much of a connection with her and felt she was only there to party. Marcia also gave away a gift during the concert that Bret had given her.

=== Eight Is Not Enough ===
First aired February 8, 2009

The eight left become eleven when Michaels brings in new blood to amp the competition.

- City: St. Louis, Missouri
- New Girls: Jamie, Jenny, Kami
- Challenge: Makeovers
- Challenge Winners: Farrah, Natasha, Mindy
- Bottom 2: Brittanya, Natasha
- Eliminated: Natasha

Elimination Reasons

- Natasha: Bret claimed that they never got beyond the friendship line.

=== Mud Bowl III ===
First aired February 15, 2009

The contestants split into teams for a Mudbowl, with Michaels and the most valuable player going solo overnight.

- City: Nashville, Tennessee
- Challenge: Mud Bowl

Pink Bus - Fallen Angels: Ashley, Farrah, Kelsey, Jamie, Jenny
Blue Bus - Sweethearts: Brittanya, Beverly, Kami, Mindy, Taya

- Challenge Winners: Sweethearts
- MVP: Mindy
- Bottom 2: Brittanya, Jenny,
- Eliminated: Jenny

Elimination Reasons

- Jenny: Jenny's father had died and Bret thought the road would be a negative environment for her.

=== Truck Stop Games ===
First aired March 1, 2009

The contestants divide into three teams for competitive truck stop games.

- City: Birmingham, Alabama
- Challenge: Truck Stop Games

Blue Team: Ashley, Beverly, Kami
Green Team: Brittanya, Mindy, Jamie
Yellow Team: Kelsey, Farrah, Taya

- Challenge Winners: Yellow Team
- Withdrew: Kami
- Eliminated: Kelsey

Elimination Reasons

- Kami: Ashley had gone into Bret's room for what the viewers assume is sex. This upset Kami and made her realize that she wasn't ready for Bret's lifestyle.
- Kelsey: After Kelsey's meltdown, it convinced Bret that she was too young and couldn't handle the pressure of the show anymore.

=== Bikini Day Care ===
First aired March 8, 2009

The seven remaining competitors take care of children at a pool party in Panama City Beach, Florida.

- City: Panama City Beach, Florida
- Challenge: Kid's Kiddie Pool Party
- Challenge Winner: Ashley
- Bottom 2: Farrah, Taya
- Eliminated: Farrah

Elimination Reasons

- Farrah: Bret realized that aside from her good looks, he and Farrah didn't have much of a connection.

=== Exes and Oh's ===
First aired March 15, 2009 (2.4M viewers)

Two women from Michaels' past, ex-girlfriend Ambre and runner-up Heather from the first Rock of Love, question the ex-boyfriends of the competitors' past. Brittanya's Ex Royal T discloses that he and Brittanya had sex right before she left for the competition. Beverly freaked out her Ex-Husband did not show up and disclosed she was a teen mother at 17. Jaz, Taya's Ex ends up having an angry outburst. Mindy admits she cheated in her past relationship. It's revealed that Ashley still lives with her ex James, and he claims they still sleep together.

- City: St. Augustine, Florida
- Guests: Ambre Lake and Heather Chadwell
- Challenge: Ex Interrogation
- Bottom 3: Ashley, Beverly, Brittanya
- Eliminated: Brittanya, Ashley^{[a]}

Elimination Reasons

- Brittanya: Brittanya tried to assault Heather and spat on Ambre. Bret let her go because he didn't like her disrespecting his friends.
- Ashley: Bret had Ashley's pass in his hand ready to give to her, but first asked her where she stood with her ex. After Ashley hesitated, Bret decided to end her tour.

=== Duet to Me One More Time ===
First aired March 22, 2009

The four remaining girls sing along with Michaels with lyrics they've written to one of his songs.

- City: Orlando, Florida
- Challenge: Singing Performing
- Challenge Winner: Beverly, Taya
- Bottom 2: Beverly, Mindy
- Eliminated: Beverly

Elimination Reasons

- Beverly: She became too emotional and "was more in love with the idea of being in love with a rockstar".

=== Double Dates ===
First aired April 5, 2009

As the finale approaches, Michaels and the remaining three contestants try fantasy dates, but competition between the girls is escalating as the end draws near.

- City: Miami, Florida
- Bottom Two: Jamie, Taya
- Eliminated: Jamie

Elimination Reasons

- Jamie: Bret misunderstood something she said as she didn't want to settle down in a relationship yet.

=== Bret's Rock of Love III ===
First aired April 12, 2009 (3.2M viewers)

The two remaining contestants, Taya and Mindy, join Michaels in the Dominican Republic for their final chance to win him.

- Destination: Dominican Republic
- Dates: Bret takes each girl on an individual date.
- Mindy's Date: Tango lessons, dinner, walk along the beach, and an overnight stay in Bret's room.
- Taya's Date: A zip-line excursion, dinner, and drinks in Bret's room.
- Bret's Rock of Love: Taya
- Eliminated: Mindy

=== Reunion Show ===
First aired April 19, 2009

22 girls (1 did not attend), reunite for the reunion stage. The contestants look back, becoming emotional and even violent as they share memories of the experience.

== After the show ==
- Ashley Klarich, Beverly Palmer, Brittaney Starr, Brittanya O'Campo, Farrah Sinclair, Gia Lynn, Marcia Alves, and Natasha McCollum all appeared on Charm School with Ricki Lake. Ashley and Marcia were first and second runners-up respectively.
- Marcia Alves was a contestant on the canceled third season of "I Love Money", where it is believed she was eliminated on the first episode. She also appeared on the show's fourth season, where she was eliminated on the fourth episode.
- Mindy Hall and Brittanya O'Campo appeared on the fourth season of I Love Money in which Mindy won and Brittanya came in sixth place.
- On August 31, 2025, it was reported that Kelsey Bateman had died "unexpectedly", aged 39.
