= Charm School with Ricki Lake =

- Season 3
- Cast of Charm School with Ricki Lake (from left to right): Top: Marcia, Natasha, K.O., Beverly, Ki Ki, Bay Bay Bay, Risky Bottom: Brittaney, Bubbles, Brittanya, Farrah, Ashley, Gia, So Hood
- Starring: Ricki Lake; La La; Stryker
- Presented by: Ricki Lake
- No. of contestants: 14
- Winner: Ebony Jones
- No. of episodes: 11

Release
- Original network: VH1
- Original release: May 11 – July 27, 2009

Season chronology
- ← Previous; Rock of Love: Charm School

Charm School with Ricki Lake is the third and final season of the VH1 reality television series Charm School. Fourteen contestants from Rock of Love Bus with Bret Michaels and Real Chance of Love must change their old ways and learn improvement through acts of charity work. Ricki Lake is the headmistress of the Charm School, and is assisted by deans Alani "La La" Vazquez and Stryker. Ebony Jones (Risky) was ultimately named Charm School Queen and was awarded the $100,000.

== Production ==
Lake compared the show to her daytime talk show Ricki Lake, stating: "All of these shows are derivative of the shows that we used to do. The topics, some of the story lines, they're all very similar to what we did every day on the show for 11 years. When you have dynamic people that have some sort of conflict and put them in a confined space together, it's bound to be dramatic."

== Ten Commandments ==
1. Thou Shalt Aspire To Be Charming
2. Thou Shalt Be a Model...Citizen
3. Thou Shalt Play Nicely With Others
4. Thou Shalt Treat Thy Body As a Temple
5. Thou Shalt Face Thy Fears
6. Thou Shalt Pull It Together
7. Thou Shalt Make Love, Not War
8. Thou Shalt Give It Thy All
9. Thou Shalt Put It To Good Use
10. Thou Shalt Be Fully Charmed

== Contestants ==
Cast member	Show	Finish
Ebony "Risky" Jones	Real Chance of Love	Winner
Marcia "Brazil" Alves	Rock of Love Bus	Episode 11 (2nd)
Ashley Klarich	Rock of Love Bus	Episode 11 (3rd)
Brittanya O'Campo	Rock of Love Bus	Episode 9
Bianca "Bubbles" Sloof	Real Chance of Love	Episode 8
Konanga "Bay Bay Bay" Tyson	Real Chance of Love	Episode 7 (Quit)
Roxanne "K.O." Gallegos	Real Chance of Love	Episode 6 (Quit)
Natasha McCollum	Rock of Love Bus	Episode 5
Brittaney Starr	Rock of Love Bus	Episode 4
Farrah Sinclair	Rock of Love Bus	Episode 3 (Quit)
Judith "So Hood" Scullark	Real Chance of Love	Episode 3 (Quit)
Lakia "Ki Ki" Bailey	Real Chance of Love	Episode 2
Gia Lynn	Rock of Love Bus	Episode 1
Beverly Palmer	Rock of Love Bus	Episode 1 (DQ)

- K.O quit in Episode 6, but it wasn't shown until Episode 7.

== Episode progress ==
#	Contestants	Episodes									
#	Contestants	1	2	3	4	5	6	7	8	9	11
1	Risky	SAFE	SAFE	SAFE	SAFE	SAFE	BTM 3	SAFE	SAFE	SAFE	WINNER
2	Marcia	SAFE	BTM 3	SAFE	BTM 3	WIN	BTM 3	SAFE	WIN	SAFE	OUT
2	Ashley	BTM 3	BTM 3	SAFE	BTM 3	BTM 3	SAFE	SAFE	BTM 2	SAFE	OUT
4	Brittanya	SAFE	SAFE	BTM 3	WIN	WIN	SAFE	SAFE	BTM 3	OUT	
5	Bubbles	SAFE	WIN	BTM 3	SAFE	BTM 2	SAFE	SAFE	OUT		
6	Bay Bay Bay	SAFE	WIN	WIN	SAFE	WIN	SAFE	QUIT			
7	K.O.	SAFE	SAFE	SAFE	WIN	WIN	QUIT*	BACK			
8	Natasha	SAFE	WIN	SAFE	WIN	OUT					
9	Brittaney	BTM 3	SAFE	BTM 3	OUT						
10	Farrah	SAFE	WIN	QUIT							
11	So Hood	SAFE	SAFE	QUIT							
12	Kiki	SAFE	OUT					BACK			
13	Gia	OUT									
14	Beverly	OUT									

Competition.
The contestant won the competition.
The contestant was on the Dean's list and was safe from expulsion.
The contestant was automatically on the Dean's list.
The contestant was safe from expulsion.
The contestant was at risk for expulsion.
The contestant was expelled.
The contestant quit the competition.
The contestant was sent to the Headmistress' Office and was immediately expelled before an elimination ceremony.
The contestant returned to the house temporarily and was a candidate to be brought back into the competition, but was not brought back.

Notes

- In Episode 1, Beverly physically assaulted Brittaney and thus was expelled immediately.
- In Episode 3, despite an expulsion ceremony, no one was expelled due to So Hood and Farrah quitting.
- *In Episode 6, Bay Bay Bay told Ricki that she is willing to give up her slot for someone who needs to be there more than her. At elimination, Ricki had a choice of KO, Risky, or Marcia. She felt the decision was too hard and felt they all needed to be there; She then decided to take up Bay Bay Bay's offer to step down. However, K.O. did not want to see Bay Bay Bay leave on her behalf, so K.O. decided to give up her own Charm School pin so that Bay Bay Bay would not leave. The episode was left on a cliffhanger with elimination unfinished. It wasn't until Episode 7 that it was revealed that K.O. quit Charm School.
- In Episode 7, Bay Bay Bay decided that she wanted to give up her seat to somebody more deserving. Ricki though that was for the best and accepted Bay Bay Bay's withdrawal. However, Bay Bay Bay had to choose her own replacement. Ki Ki and KO were brought back on Bay Bay Bay's request, however she later felt that neither of them deserved to return to Charm School and rejected their return.

== List of episodes ==
1. Thou Shalt Aspire To Be Charming (First Aired May 11, 2009)
  - Commandment: Thou Shalt Aspire To Be Charming. The girls are asked to donate some of their clothes to charity.
  - Bottom 3: Ashley, Brittaney, Gia
  - Expelled: Gia
2. Can't We All Just Get Along? (First aired May 18, 2009)
  - Commandment: Thou Shalt Be a Model... Citizen. Tanya Acker educates the girls on global warming, poverty and overall social responsibility, and they are challenged to clean the Los Angeles River.
  - Bottom 3: Ashley, Ki Ki, Marcia
  - Expelled: Ki Ki
3. If You Can't Play Nice, Don't Play At All (First Aired May 25, 2009)
  - Commandment: Thou Shalt Play Nicely With Others. The contestants are challenged to care for elderly people.
  - Bottom 3: Brittaney, Brittanya, Bubbles
  - Quit: So Hood, Farrah
4. Bubble Trouble (First aired June 1, 2009)
  - Commandment: Thou Shalt Treat Thy Body As a Temple. Dr. Robert Shapiro explains to the girls how to treat their bodies correctly, and exposes the dangers of smoking and excessive alcohol consumption. They are challenged to help children exercise.
  - Bottom 3: Ashley, Brittaney, Marcia
  - Expelled: Brittaney
5. Fear Factors (First aired June 8, 2009)
  - Commandment: Thou Shalt Face Thy Fears. Dr. Allison Arnold asks the girls to reveal their fears, and thus has them participate in group activities in an attempt to liberate them from their fears. They are challenged to face their fears in a haunted hospital (They visited the Linda Vista Community Hospital in Los Angeles).
  - Bottom 3: Ashley, Bubbles, Natasha
  - Expelled: Natasha
6. Thou Shalt Put It Together (First aired June 15, 2009)
  - Commandment: Thou Shalt pull it together. The girls are asked about their career goals, why they want to reach these goals, and the first step to reaching them. They are challenged to build a playground for children.
  - Bottom 3: K.O., Marcia, Risky
  - Withdrew: K.O.
7. Of Two Evils, Choose the Less (First aired June 29, 2009)
  - Commandment: Thou Shalt Make Love, Not War. Two men from the Museum of Tolerance educate the girls on tolerance of religion, race and sexual orientation. Their challenge is to clean out the dog cages.
  - Quit: Bay Bay Bay
8. Ride Em Cowgirl (First aired July 6, 2009)
  - Commandment: Thou Shalt Give It Thy All. The girls are challenged to earn money for charity by riding a mechanical bull.
  - Bottom 3: Ashley, Brittanya, Bubbles
  - Eliminated: Bubbles
9. The Big (Not So) Easy (First aired July 13, 2009)
  - Commandment: Thou Shalt Put It To Good Use. The girls go to New Orleans, Louisiana and face a series of challenges, including building a playground on the basketball court, feeding the homeless, and cleaning a garage.
  - Expelled: Brittanya
10. The Lost Commandments (First aired July 20, 2009)
  - Hosted by La La & Stryker
11. Thou Shalt Be Fully Charmed (First aired July 27, 2009)
  - Commandment: Thou Shalt Be Fully Charmed. The challenge is TAG (Truth, Amends, Gratitude) with special guests including Dr. Allison Arnold, Marcia's Mother, Risky's Mother, Ashley's Boyfriend and Son.
  - Final Three: Ashley, Marcia, Risky
  - Expelled: Ashley, Marcia
  - Winner: Risky

== After the Show ==
Marcia, Farrah, and Ashley appeared on Rock of Love Girls: Where Are They Now?

Marcia and Bubbles appeared on the cancelled I Love Money 3, where they were believed to have come in last and third respectively.

Marcia and Brittanya appeared on I Love Money 4, coming in fourteenth, and sixth respectively.
