= Destiney Sue Moore =

American reality television personality

- Born: Destiney Sue Walker; Libby, Montana, U.S
- Other name: Stephanie Moore
- Occupations: Reality television star, actress, model
- Years active: 1999–present
- Television: Rock of Love with Bret Michaels, I Love Money, Rock of Love: Charm School

Destiney Sue Moore is an American reality television star, actress and model. She is best known for her appearances on the VH1 hit celebreality shows; Rock of Love with Bret Michaels, I Love Money and Rock of Love: Charm School.

== Modeling career ==
Moore worked as a softcore, fetish model posing for different magazines and websites, for several years under the name, Stephanie Moore. She also worked as a stripper.

In 2009, she posed on the cover of Guitar World magazine, alongside Rock of Love season 2, cast member Kristy Jo Muller. She posed nude in the September 2011, issue of Hustler magazine.

== Television career ==
In 2008, Moore appeared as a contestant on the second season of VH1's hit celebreality series, Rock of Love with Bret Michaels, where she placed third overall. During the reunion special it was revealed she, her father and Bret Michaels rode motorcycles together before her father died from cancer, as her father was a fan of Poison.

Shortly after the airing of Rock of Love season 2, she was a contestant on the first season of VH1 spin-off; I Love Money. She was eliminated in the fifth episodes, placing thirteenth overall. She then appeared as a contestant on, Rock of Love: Charm School, where she was the runner-up. In the final expulsion ceremony, Moore was offered an official internship with Charm School, judge Daniella Clarke, she revealed during the reunion special that she decided to decline the internship and team up with her fiancé, who was a design artist, and launch her own brand named Divination.

Moore went on to appear in other various television shows, including; Hole in the Wall, MANswers and Baggage. She had multiple minor acting roles, including appearing in the 2007, film, Georgia Rule and in the 2009, horror film, Reality Horror Night.

== Filmography ==
Film and television
Year	Title	Role	Notes
1999	The Pornographer	Stripper #2	
2007	Georgia Rule	Waitress	
2008	Rock of Love with Bret Michaels season 2	Self; contestant	3rd place, 12 episodes
2008	I Love Money season 1	Self; contestant	13th place, 6 episodes
2008	Hole in the Wall	Self; contestant	1 episode
2008	Rock of Love: Charm School	Self; contestant	Runner-up, all episodes
2008	MANswers	Self; model	3 episodes
2009	Reality Horror Night	Destiney Sue Moore	
2010	Baggage	Self; contestant	1 episode
2010	Rock of Love Girls: Where Are They Now	Self; feature	TV special
2010	The Adventures of Señor Toro	Pregnant woman	1 episode
2020	Talk of Love	Self; interviewee	Web series, 1 episode

Music videos
Year	Title	Artist	Role
2006	Situations	Escape the Fate	Dancer
