= List of Flavor of Love contestants =

This is a list of contestants who have appeared on the VH1 reality television show Flavor of Love and its spin-offs I Love New York, Charm School, Rock of Love, I Love Money, Real Chance of Love, For the Love of Ray J, Daisy of Love, Megan Wants a Millionaire and Frank the Entertainer in a Basement Affair.

== Contestants ==
Suitor of the competition
Winner of the competition
Runner-up of the competition
Eliminated during the competition
Quit the competition
Guest appearance

First series (Suitor)	Nickname	Real name	Series										Ref
First series (Suitor)	Nickname	Real name	Flavor of Love (2006–2008)	I Love New York (2007–2008)	Charm School (2007–2009)	Rock of Love (2007–2009)	I Love Money (2008–2010)	Real Chance of Love (2008–2009)	For the Love of Ray J (2009–2010)	Daisy of Love (2009)	Megan Wants a Millionaire (2009)	Frank the Entertainer in a Basement Affair (2010)	Ref
Flavor of Love (Flavor Flav)	Hoopz	Nicole Alexander	Winner				Winner						
Flavor of Love (Flavor Flav)	New York	Tiffany Pollard	Runner-up (Note: New York is the runner-up of both Flavor of Love and Flavor of Love 2.)	Suitor	Guest								
Flavor of Love (Flavor Flav)	Pumkin	Brooke Thompson	Top 3	Guest	Top 5		Top 5						
Flavor of Love (Flavor Flav)	Goldie	Courtney Jackson	Top 4		Top 9								
Flavor of Love (Flavor Flav)	Smiley	Leilene Ondrade	Top 5		Runner-up		Top 17						
Flavor of Love (Flavor Flav)	Hottie	Schatar Taylor	Top 6		Top 8								
Flavor of Love (Flavor Flav)	Red Oyster	Abigail Kintanar	Top 7										
Flavor of Love (Flavor Flav)	Sweetie	Tika Rainn	Top 8										
Flavor of Love (Flavor Flav)	Peaches	Kim Manning	Top 10										
Flavor of Love (Flavor Flav)	Serious	Cristal Steverson	Top 10		Top 10								
Flavor of Love (Flavor Flav)	Apples	Melanie Prudhomme	Top 15										
Flavor of Love (Flavor Flav)	Dimplez	Margaret Heinzeroth	Top 15										
Flavor of Love (Flavor Flav)	Georgia	Jefandi Cato	Top 15										
Flavor of Love (Flavor Flav)	Miss Latin	Xotchitl Rodriguez	Top 15										
Flavor of Love (Flavor Flav)	Rain	Thela Brown	Top 15		Top 13								
Flavor of Love (Flavor Flav)	Bubblez	April Navarro	Top 20										
Flavor of Love (Flavor Flav)	Cherry	Mieko Smith	Top 20										
Flavor of Love (Flavor Flav)	Picasso	Sarah Wilson	Top 20										
Flavor of Love (Flavor Flav)	Shellz	Amber Kemp	Top 20										
Flavor of Love (Flavor Flav)	Smokey	Johanna Olson	Top 20										
Flavor of Love 2 (Flavor Flav)	Deelishis	Chandra Davis	Winner				(Note: Appeared in the unreleased I Love Money 3, which never aired after the murder of Jasmine Fiore.)						
Flavor of Love 2 (Flavor Flav)	Krazy	Heather Crawford	Top 3		Top 12								
Flavor of Love 2 (Flavor Flav)	Bootz	Larissa Hodge	Top 4		Top 6								
Flavor of Love 2 (Flavor Flav)	Buckeey	Shay Johnson	Top 5		Top 4								
Flavor of Love 2 (Flavor Flav)	Buckwild	Becky Johnston	Top 8		Top 3		Top 9						
Flavor of Love 2 (Flavor Flav)	Nibblz	Domenique Majors	Top 8				Top 16						
Flavor of Love 2 (Flavor Flav)	Beatuful	Kelly Jay Jenkins	Top 8										
Flavor of Love 2 (Flavor Flav)	Like Dat	Darra Boyd	Top 9		Top 8								
Flavor of Love 2 (Flavor Flav)	Toasteee	Jennifer Toof	Top 10		Top 11		Top 6						
Flavor of Love 2 (Flavor Flav)	Payshintz	Jasmine Dare	Top 13										
Flavor of Love 2 (Flavor Flav)	Somethin	Tykeisha Thomas	Top 13										
Flavor of Love 2 (Flavor Flav)	Tiger	Britney Morano	Top 13										
Flavor of Love 2 (Flavor Flav)	Spunkeey	Maria Dunbar	Top 15										
Flavor of Love 2 (Flavor Flav)	Wire	Jesselynn Desmond	Top 15										
Flavor of Love 2 (Flavor Flav)	Bamma	Tarasha Lee	Top 20										
Flavor of Love 2 (Flavor Flav)	Choclate	Ronnise Clark	Top 20										
Flavor of Love 2 (Flavor Flav)	Hood	Yanay Yancy	Top 20										
Flavor of Love 2 (Flavor Flav)	H-Town	Renee Austin	Top 20										
Flavor of Love 2 (Flavor Flav)	Eye'z	Bonnie Mercado	Top 20 (Note: Eye'z is revealed at the elimination ceremony to be a spy for Flav, and not an actual contestant.)										
Flavor of Love 2 (Flavor Flav)	Saaphyri	Saaphyri Windsor	Disqualified (Note: Saaphyri was ejected from the house before the elimination ceremony, and never received a nickname from Flav.)		Winner		Top 5						
I Love New York (Tiffany Pollard)	Tango	Patrick Hunter		Winner									
I Love New York (Tiffany Pollard)	Chance	Kamal Givens		Runner-up			Top 12	Suitor					
I Love New York (Tiffany Pollard)	Real	Ahmad Givens		Top 3			Top 4	Suitor					
I Love New York (Tiffany Pollard)	Whiteboy	Joshua Gallander		Top 4			Runner-up						
I Love New York (Tiffany Pollard)	12 Pack	David Amerman		Top 5			Top 10			Top 3			
I Love New York (Tiffany Pollard)	Mr. Boston	Lee Marks		Top 6			Top 14						
I Love New York (Tiffany Pollard)	Rico	Sandro Padrone		Top 7									
I Love New York (Tiffany Pollard)	Heat	Jason Rosell		Top 9			Top 15						
I Love New York (Tiffany Pollard)	Onix	William Lash		Top 9			Top 18						
I Love New York (Tiffany Pollard)	Bonez	Kevin Peters		Top 12			Top 12						
I Love New York (Tiffany Pollard)	T-Weed	Kevin Watson		Top 12			Top 16						
I Love New York (Tiffany Pollard)	Pootie	Lamonty Council		Top 12									
I Love New York (Tiffany Pollard)	Romance	Ricky Perillo		Top 15									
I Love New York (Tiffany Pollard)	Token	Chase Irwin		Top 15									
I Love New York (Tiffany Pollard)	Trendz	Hashim Smith		Top 15									
I Love New York (Tiffany Pollard)	Ace	Darin Darnell		Top 20									
I Love New York (Tiffany Pollard)	Jersey	Bryant Covert		Top 20									
I Love New York (Tiffany Pollard)	T-Bone	Tyrone Ellis		Top 20									
I Love New York (Tiffany Pollard)	T-Money	Thomas Young		Top 20									
I Love New York (Tiffany Pollard)	Wood	Randy Richwood		Top 20									
Rock of Love (Bret Michaels)	Jes	Jessica Rickleff				Winner							
Rock of Love (Bret Michaels)	Heather	Heather Chadwell			Top 4	Runner-up	Top 9						
Rock of Love (Bret Michaels)	Lacey	Lacey Conner			Top 3	Top 3							
Rock of Love (Bret Michaels)	Brandi M.	Brandi Mahon			Winner	Top 4							
Rock of Love (Bret Michaels)	Samantha	Samantha Weisberg				Top 5							
Rock of Love (Bret Michaels)	Mia	Mia Tidwell				Top 6							
Rock of Love (Bret Michaels)	Magdalena	Magdalena Widz				Top 7							
Rock of Love (Bret Michaels)	Erin	Erin Shattuck				Top 8							
Rock of Love (Bret Michaels)	Brandi C.	Brandi Cunningham			Top 7	Top 9	Top 7				Guest		
Rock of Love (Bret Michaels)	Rodeo	Cindy Steele			Top 11	Top 10	Top 11						
Rock of Love (Bret Michaels)	Dallas	Dallas Harrison			Top 8	Top 12							
Rock of Love (Bret Michaels)	Kristia	Kristia Krueger				Top 12							
Rock of Love (Bret Michaels)	Faith	Faith Rorrer				Top 16							
Rock of Love (Bret Michaels)	Tamara	Tamara Witmer				Top 16	Top 19						
Rock of Love (Bret Michaels)	Tawny	Tawny Amber Young				Top 16							
Rock of Love (Bret Michaels)	Tiffany	Tiffany Carmona				Top 16							
Rock of Love (Bret Michaels)	Bonnie	Bonnie Giuliano				Top 21							
Rock of Love (Bret Michaels)	Jessica	Jessica Starkman				Top 21							
Rock of Love (Bret Michaels)	Krista	Krista Simonsen				Top 21							
Rock of Love (Bret Michaels)	Lauren	Lauren Petticrew				Top 21							
Rock of Love (Bret Michaels)	Raven	Raven Williams			Top 14	Top 21							
Rock of Love (Bret Michaels)	Kelly	Kelly Munroe				Top 25							
Rock of Love (Bret Michaels)	Kimberly	Kimberly Fragipane				Top 25							
Rock of Love (Bret Michaels)	Meredith	Meredith Plavidal				Top 25							
Rock of Love (Bret Michaels)	Pam	Pam McGarvey				Top 25							
I Love New York 2 (Tiffany Pollard)	Tailor Made	George Weisgerber		Winner			Runner-up						
I Love New York 2 (Tiffany Pollard)	Buddha	Ezra Masters		Runner-up			Top 15						
I Love New York 2 (Tiffany Pollard)	Punk	David Otunga		Top 3									
I Love New York 2 (Tiffany Pollard)	The Entertainer	Frank Maresca		Top 4			Top 8 (Note: Also appears in I Love Money 2, where he placed 11th.)					Suitor	
I Love New York 2 (Tiffany Pollard)	Mr. Wise	Solomon Wise		Top 5									
I Love New York 2 (Tiffany Pollard)	Pretty	Juan McCullum		Top 6									
I Love New York 2 (Tiffany Pollard)	Wolf	Greg Harris		Top 7									
I Love New York 2 (Tiffany Pollard)	It	Kwame Smalls		Top 9			Runner-up						
I Love New York 2 (Tiffany Pollard)	Midget Mac	Torrey Samuels		Top 9			Top 17						
I Love New York 2 (Tiffany Pollard)	20 Pack	Nico Vasquez		Top 9			Top 8						
I Love New York 2 (Tiffany Pollard)	Cheezy	Matthew Levy		Top 12			Top 18						
I Love New York 2 (Tiffany Pollard)	Man Man	Collin Anthony Vickers		Top 12									
I Love New York 2 (Tiffany Pollard)	Knock Out	Deandre Allberry		Top 15									
I Love New York 2 (Tiffany Pollard)	Yours	Lafayette Brown		Top 15									
I Love New York 2 (Tiffany Pollard)	Unsure	Jared Roberts		Top 15									
I Love New York 2 (Tiffany Pollard)	Champion	Jimmy Houston		Top 20									
I Love New York 2 (Tiffany Pollard)	Doc	Dwight Holliday		Top 20									
I Love New York 2 (Tiffany Pollard)	Ears	David Cuevas		Top 20									
I Love New York 2 (Tiffany Pollard)	Sweetie Pie	Darnell Wright		Top 20									
I Love New York 2 (Tiffany Pollard)	Milliown	Jamal Trulove		Top 20									
Rock of Love 2 (Bret Michaels)	Ambre	Ambre Lake				Winner							
Rock of Love 2 (Bret Michaels)	Daisy	Daisy de la Hoya				Runner-up				Suitor			
Rock of Love 2 (Bret Michaels)	Destiney	Destiney Sue Moore			Runner-up	Top 3	Top 13						
Rock of Love 2 (Bret Michaels)	Jessica	Jessica Kinni			Top 6	Top 4							
Rock of Love 2 (Bret Michaels)	Megan	Megan Hauserman			Top 10	Top 5	Top 3				Suitor		
Rock of Love 2 (Bret Michaels)	Kristy Joe	Kristy Joe Muller			Top 6	Top 6							
Rock of Love 2 (Bret Michaels)	Inna	Inna Dmitrenko			Top 9	Top 7							
Rock of Love 2 (Bret Michaels)	Catherine	Catherine Brown				Top 9							
Rock of Love 2 (Bret Michaels)	Peyton	Peyton Turner				Top 9							
Rock of Love 2 (Bret Michaels)	Aubry	Aubry Fisher				Top 10							
Rock of Love 2 (Bret Michaels)	Frenchy	Angelique Morgan			Top 12	Top 12	Top 6						
Rock of Love 2 (Bret Michaels)	Roxy	Roxy Collins				Top 12							
Rock of Love 2 (Bret Michaels)	Korie	Korie Hutchinson				Top 15							
Rock of Love 2 (Bret Michaels)	Niki	Niki Kuskey				Top 15							
Rock of Love 2 (Bret Michaels)	Sara	Sara Wilson				Top 15							
Rock of Love 2 (Bret Michaels)	Courtney	Courtney Van Dusen			Top 13	Top 20							
Rock of Love 2 (Bret Michaels)	Ashley	Ashley Dingess				Top 20							
Rock of Love 2 (Bret Michaels)	Erin	Erin Martin				Top 20							
Rock of Love 2 (Bret Michaels)	Missi	Missi Chancey				Top 20							
Rock of Love 2 (Bret Michaels)	Jackye	Jackye Migliaccio				Top 20							
Flavor of Love 3 (Flavor Flav)	Thing 2	LaTresha Hall	Winner										
Flavor of Love 3 (Flavor Flav)	Black	Candace Cabrera	Runner-up										
Flavor of Love 3 (Flavor Flav)	Sinceer	Nicole Featherston	Top 3										
Flavor of Love 3 (Flavor Flav)	Seezinz	Autumn Joi	Top 4										
Flavor of Love 3 (Flavor Flav)	Tree	Rashida Shaw	Top 5										
Flavor of Love 3 (Flavor Flav)	Thing 1	LaTrisha Hall	Top 7										
Flavor of Love 3 (Flavor Flav)	Prototype	Maria Geiger	Top 7										
Flavor of Love 3 (Flavor Flav)	Hotlanta	Nicole Essigman	Top 9										
Flavor of Love 3 (Flavor Flav)	Luscious D	Shannon Kulis	Top 9										
Flavor of Love 3 (Flavor Flav)	Prancer	Mercedes Clausen	Top 10				Top 4						
Flavor of Love 3 (Flavor Flav)	Shy	Monalisa Brown	Top 6 (Note: Four new contestants were added after their elimination.)										
Flavor of Love 3 (Flavor Flav)	Myammee	Angela Pitts	Top 8				Winner						
Flavor of Love 3 (Flavor Flav)	Bunz	Courtney Lynn	Top 8										
Flavor of Love 3 (Flavor Flav)	Bee-Ex	Twana Denard	Top 9										
Flavor of Love 3 (Flavor Flav)	Gravyee	Yvonne Govan	Top 10										
Flavor of Love 3 (Flavor Flav)	Rayna	Earaina Mixon	Top 12										
Flavor of Love 3 (Flavor Flav)	Ice	Amanda Habrowski	Top 12				Top 7						
Flavor of Love 3 (Flavor Flav)	St. Lewis	Brittanie Skye	Top 15										
Flavor of Love 3 (Flavor Flav)	El	Lisa	Top 15										
Flavor of Love 3 (Flavor Flav)	Tik	Courtney Dee	Top 15										
Flavor of Love 3 (Flavor Flav)	Savanna	Savanna Stidwell	Top 20										
Flavor of Love 3 (Flavor Flav)	Shore-Tee	Angela	Top 20										
Flavor of Love 3 (Flavor Flav)	Dymz	Esperanza Bloom	Top 20										
Flavor of Love 3 (Flavor Flav)	Peechee	Christa Hildenburg	Top 20										
Flavor of Love 3 (Flavor Flav)	Q-Tee	Erika Louis	Top 20										
Real Chance of Love (Real & Chance)	Corn Fed	Abbi Noah					Top 8	Winner (Real)					
Real Chance of Love (Real & Chance)	Bay Bay Bay	Konanga Tyson			Top 6			Runner-up					
Real Chance of Love (Real & Chance)	Cali	Christine Ly					Top 10	Runner-up					
Real Chance of Love (Real & Chance)	Risky	Ebony Jones			Winner			Runner-up					
Real Chance of Love (Real & Chance)	Rabbit	Jessica Rich						Top 6					
Real Chance of Love (Real & Chance)	Milf	Ahmo Hight					Top 14	Top 6					
Real Chance of Love (Real & Chance)	K.O.	Roxanne Gallegos			Top 7			Top 7					
Real Chance of Love (Real & Chance)	Bubbles	Bianca Sloof			Top 5			Top 8					
Real Chance of Love (Real & Chance)	Ki Ki	Lakia Bailey			Top 12			Top 9					
Real Chance of Love (Real & Chance)	Meatball	Angela Campanale						Top 10					
Real Chance of Love (Real & Chance)	Lusty	Shonda Humphreys						Top 11					
Real Chance of Love (Real & Chance)	Promo	April Oudshoorn						Top 13					
Real Chance of Love (Real & Chance)	So Hood	Judith Scullark			Top 11			Top 13					
Real Chance of Love (Real & Chance)	Sexy Legs	Menika Evans						Top 14					
Real Chance of Love (Real & Chance)	Harmony	Harmony Farhadi						Top 17					
Real Chance of Love (Real & Chance)	Isha	Willesha Pollard						Top 17					
Real Chance of Love (Real & Chance)	Stalker	Lynnette Fornby						Top 17					
Rock of Love Bus (Bret Michaels)	Taya	Taya Parker				Winner							
Rock of Love Bus (Bret Michaels)	Mindy	Mindy Hall				Runner-up	Winner						
Rock of Love Bus (Bret Michaels)	Jamie	Jamie Ross				Top 3							
Rock of Love Bus (Bret Michaels)	Beverly	Beverly Palmer			Disqualified	Top 4							
Rock of Love Bus (Bret Michaels)	Ashley	Ashley Klarich			Runner-up	Top 6							
Rock of Love Bus (Bret Michaels)	Brittanya	Brittanya O'Campo			Top 4	Top 6	Top 6						
Rock of Love Bus (Bret Michaels)	Farrah	Farrah Sinclair			Top 11	Top 7							
Rock of Love Bus (Bret Michaels)	Kelsey	Kelsey Bateman				Top 9							
Rock of Love Bus (Bret Michaels)	Kami	Kami Samargis-Brossard				Top 9							
Rock of Love Bus (Bret Michaels)	Jennifer	Jennifer Beitzel				Top 10							
Rock of Love Bus (Bret Michaels)	Natasha	Natasha McCollum			Top 8	Top 11							
Rock of Love Bus (Bret Michaels)	Brazil	Marcia Alves			Runner-up	Top 9	Top 14 (Note: Also appeared on the unreleased I Love Money 3.)						
Rock of Love Bus (Bret Michaels)	Maria	Maria Bock				Top 10							
Rock of Love Bus (Bret Michaels)	Brittaney	Brittaney Starr			Top 9	Top 11							
Rock of Love Bus (Bret Michaels)	Melissa	Melissa Martinez				Top 12							
Rock of Love Bus (Bret Michaels)	Constandina	Constandina Savvenas				Top 15							
Rock of Love Bus (Bret Michaels)	Megan	Megan Tomczak				Top 15							
Rock of Love Bus (Bret Michaels)	Samantha	Samantha Bengston				Top 15							
Rock of Love Bus (Bret Michaels)	DJ Lady Tribe	Nikki "DJ Lady Tribe" Shamdasani				Top 20							
Rock of Love Bus (Bret Michaels)	Gia	Gia Lynn			Top 13	Top 20							
Rock of Love Bus (Bret Michaels)	Stephanie	Stephanie Farris				Top 20							
Rock of Love Bus (Bret Michaels)	Heather	Heather Mariscal				Top 20							
Rock of Love Bus (Bret Michaels)	Marci	Marciela Mendoza				Top 20							
For the Love of Ray J (Ray J)	Cocktail	Joanna Hernandez							Winner				
For the Love of Ray J (Ray J)	Unique	Danielle Pastorino							Runner-up				
For the Love of Ray J (Ray J)	Danger	Monica Leon							Top 3				
For the Love of Ray J (Ray J)	Chardonnay	Christa Nolley							Top 4				
For the Love of Ray J (Ray J)	Feisty	Elizabeth Mendez					Top 12		Top 5				
For the Love of Ray J (Ray J)	Cashmere	Leah Minor							Top 6				
For the Love of Ray J (Ray J)	Lil' Hood	Chelsey Fatula							Top 8				
For the Love of Ray J (Ray J)	Stacks	Summer Smith							Top 8				
For the Love of Ray J (Ray J)	Caviar	Elizabeth Ahmed							Top 9				
For the Love of Ray J (Ray J)	Stilts	Sharee English							Top 10				
For the Love of Ray J (Ray J)	Genuine	Jillian Campbell							Top 12				
For the Love of Ray J (Ray J)	Atomic Bomb	Jerri Vega							Top 12				
For the Love of Ray J (Ray J)	Naturalle	Keyonna Patterson							Top 14				
For the Love of Ray J (Ray J)	Hot Cocoa	Ja'Wanna Waddy							Top 14				
Daisy of Love (Daisy de la Hoya)	London	Joshua Lee								Winner			
Daisy of Love (Daisy de la Hoya)	Flex	TJ Markiewicz								Runner-up			
Daisy of Love (Daisy de la Hoya)	Sinister	Derrick Tribbett								Top 4			
Daisy of Love (Daisy de la Hoya)	Chi Chi	Branden Mathena					Top 13			Top 5			
Daisy of Love (Daisy de la Hoya)	Big Rig	Jeremiah Riggs								Top 5			
Daisy of Love (Daisy de la Hoya)	Fox	Daniel Alfonso								Top 6			
Daisy of Love (Daisy de la Hoya)	6 Gauge	Chris Kummer					Top 5			Top 7			
Daisy of Love (Daisy de la Hoya)	Cage	Aric Nelson								Top 8			
Daisy of Love (Daisy de la Hoya)	Tool Box	Miguel Gonzalez								Top 12			
Daisy of Love (Daisy de la Hoya)	Cable Guy	Randall Logan								Top 12			
Daisy of Love (Daisy de la Hoya)	Brooklyn	Christopher					Runner-up			Top 12			
Daisy of Love (Daisy de la Hoya)	Professor	Brandon Cabeza								Top 15			
Daisy of Love (Daisy de la Hoya)	Weasel	Pauly Michaelis								Top 15			
Daisy of Love (Daisy de la Hoya)	Flipper	Mike Gaboff								Top 15			
Daisy of Love (Daisy de la Hoya)	Torch	Kenn Youngar								Top 20			
Daisy of Love (Daisy de la Hoya)	Dropout	Tristan Trouble								Top 20			
Daisy of Love (Daisy de la Hoya)	'86	Nisse Landeberg								Top 20			
Daisy of Love (Daisy de la Hoya)	'85	Pelle Landeberg								Top 20			
Daisy of Love (Daisy de la Hoya)	'84	Calle Landeberg								Top 20			
Megan Wants a Millionaire (Megan Hauserman)	TJ	TJ Diab									Cancelled (Note: After the murder of Jasmine Fiore, Megan Wants a Millionaire was pulled off the air after only three episodes.)		
Megan Wants a Millionaire (Megan Hauserman)	Punisher	Sharay Hayes					Top 4				Cancelled		
Megan Wants a Millionaire (Megan Hauserman)	Ryan	Ryan Jenkins									Cancelled		
Megan Wants a Millionaire (Megan Hauserman)	Cisco	Francisco Baserva					Top 7				Cancelled		
Megan Wants a Millionaire (Megan Hauserman)	Al	Al Jenney									Cancelled		
Megan Wants a Millionaire (Megan Hauserman)	Alex	Alexander Netto					Top 15				Cancelled		
Megan Wants a Millionaire (Megan Hauserman)	Corey	Corey Thomas									Cancelled		
Megan Wants a Millionaire (Megan Hauserman)	Sex Toy Dave	Dave Levine									Cancelled		
Megan Wants a Millionaire (Megan Hauserman)	00 Dave	David									Cancelled		
Megan Wants a Millionaire (Megan Hauserman)	Big Mike	Mike Blume									Cancelled		
Megan Wants a Millionaire (Megan Hauserman)	Joe	Joe Pascolla									Top 12		
Megan Wants a Millionaire (Megan Hauserman)	Matt	Matt Riviera									Top 12		
Megan Wants a Millionaire (Megan Hauserman)	Shaun	Shaun Robertson									Top 14		
Megan Wants a Millionaire (Megan Hauserman)	Garth	Garth McKeown					Top 9				Top 14		
Megan Wants a Millionaire (Megan Hauserman)	Donald	Donald Farmer									Top 17		
Megan Wants a Millionaire (Megan Hauserman)	James	James Curran									Top 17		
Megan Wants a Millionaire (Megan Hauserman)	Audi	Audi Pineda									Top 17		
Real Chance of Love 2 (Real & Chance)	Doll	Jackie DaFonseca						Winner (Real)					
Real Chance of Love 2 (Real & Chance)	Hot Wings	Kamille Leai					Runner-up	Winner (Chance)					
Real Chance of Love 2 (Real & Chance)	Mamacita	Michelle Cervantes					Top 18	Runner-up					
Real Chance of Love 2 (Real & Chance)	Sassy	Gabrielle Carey					Top 10	Runner-up					
Real Chance of Love 2 (Real & Chance)	Pocahontas	Nancy Rodriguez						Top 5					
Real Chance of Love 2 (Real & Chance)	Baker	Tamara Moore						Top 6					
Real Chance of Love 2 (Real & Chance)	Flirty	Amparo Rosa						Top 8					
Real Chance of Love 2 (Real & Chance)	Classy	Kaylana Reese						Top 8					
Real Chance of Love 2 (Real & Chance)	Blonde Baller	Kip Force					Top 11	Top 9					
Real Chance of Love 2 (Real & Chance)	Spanish Fly	Shirley Alvarez						Top 10					
Real Chance of Love 2 (Real & Chance)	PS	Tricia Higgins						Top 11					
Real Chance of Love 2 (Real & Chance)	Junk	Myrline Richards						Top 13					
Real Chance of Love 2 (Real & Chance)	Lady	Dolly Gray						Top 13					
Real Chance of Love 2 (Real & Chance)	Apple	Diana Hughes						Top 14					
Real Chance of Love 2 (Real & Chance)	Aloha	Raschelle Rawlins						Top 15					
Real Chance of Love 2 (Real & Chance)	Wiggly	Kayla Baker						Top 16					
Real Chance of Love 2 (Real & Chance)	Freckles	Jennifer Antoinette						Top 18					
Real Chance of Love 2 (Real & Chance)	Ribbon	Olympia Norris						Top 18					
Real Chance of Love 2 (Real & Chance)	Vegas	Tina Ullman						Disqualified					
Real Chance of Love 2 (Real & Chance)	Show Me	Amber Mountjoy						Disqualified					
For the Love of Ray J 2 (Ray J)	Mz. Berry	Connie Deveaux							Winner				
For the Love of Ray J 2 (Ray J)	Platinum	Mary Cherry							Runner-up				
For the Love of Ray J 2 (Ray J)	Luscious	Elle Navarro							Top 3				
For the Love of Ray J 2 (Ray J)	Caliente	Angeles Gimenez							Top 4				
For the Love of Ray J 2 (Ray J)	Heartbreaker	Susana Montez							Top 5				
For the Love of Ray J 2 (Ray J)	Flossy	Bethany Lucas							Top 7				
For the Love of Ray J 2 (Ray J)	Exotica	Leila Depina							Top 7				
For the Love of Ray J 2 (Ray J)	Extra	Sharmisa Garner							Top 8				
For the Love of Ray J 2 (Ray J)	Jaguar	Courtney Cameron							Top 9				
For the Love of Ray J 2 (Ray J)	Paradeez	Adell Figueria							Top 10				
For the Love of Ray J 2 (Ray J)	Adorable	Mikaela Rosario							Top 12				
For the Love of Ray J 2 (Ray J)	Popper	Olia McKinzie							Top 12				
For the Love of Ray J 2 (Ray J)	Lava	Taniesh Simpson							Top 14				
For the Love of Ray J 2 (Ray J)	Just Right	Latoya Bledsoe							Top 14				
For the Love of Ray J 2 (Ray J)	Trouble	Rachel Reed							Top 16				
For the Love of Ray J 2 (Ray J)	Gifts	Franschelle Criner							Top 16				
For the Love of Ray J 2 (Ray J)	Fettuccini	Allison Ceglio							Top 19				
For the Love of Ray J 2 (Ray J)	Diego	Krista Hoffman							Top 19				
For the Love of Ray J 2 (Ray J)	Tipsy	Hana Franek							Top 19				
Frank the Entertainer in a Basement Affair (Frank Maresca)	Kerry S.	Kerry Schwartz										Winner	
Frank the Entertainer in a Basement Affair (Frank Maresca)	Cathy	Cathy Nardone										Runner-up	
Frank the Entertainer in a Basement Affair (Frank Maresca)	Felicia	Felicia Serano										Top 3	
Frank the Entertainer in a Basement Affair (Frank Maresca)	Dana	Dana Piza										Top 4	
Frank the Entertainer in a Basement Affair (Frank Maresca)	Melody	Melody Pinkerton										Top 5	
Frank the Entertainer in a Basement Affair (Frank Maresca)	Melissa	Melissa DeBlieck										Top 6	
Frank the Entertainer in a Basement Affair (Frank Maresca)	Annie	Annie Hirsch										Top 7	
Frank the Entertainer in a Basement Affair (Frank Maresca)	Renee	Renee Taylor										Top 8	
Frank the Entertainer in a Basement Affair (Frank Maresca)	Christi	Christi Rantis										Top 9	
Frank the Entertainer in a Basement Affair (Frank Maresca)	Jenny	Jenny Jones										Top 10	
Frank the Entertainer in a Basement Affair (Frank Maresca)	Tammy	Tammy										Top 11	
Frank the Entertainer in a Basement Affair (Frank Maresca)	Jessica	Jessica										Top 13	
Frank the Entertainer in a Basement Affair (Frank Maresca)	Mandy	Mandy										Top 13	
Frank the Entertainer in a Basement Affair (Frank Maresca)	Stephanie	Stephanie Perry										Top 15	
Frank the Entertainer in a Basement Affair (Frank Maresca)	Kari M.	Kari M.										Top 15	
