= The Next :15 =

- Genre: Reality
- Starring: Tiffany Pollard; Benzino; Jennifer Williams; Claudia Jordan; Laura Govan; Karamo Brown
- Country of origin: United States
- Original language: English
- No. of seasons: 1
- No. of episodes: 10

Production
- Executive producers: Carlos King; Erica Forstdat; Robyn Greene Arrington; Sergio Alfaro
- Producers: Lamar Chase; Vivian Payton
- Running time: 42 minutes
- Production companies: Kingdom Reign Entertainment; Eclipse TV

Original release
- Network: TV One
- Release: February 10 – April 10, 2016

The Next :15 is an American reality television series that premiered on February 10, 2016, on the TV One cable network. The show chronicles the next chapter in the careers of six reality television veterans.

== Cast ==
- Tiffany Pollard – former cast member of Celebrity Big Brother, Flavor of Love, I Love New York, New York Goes to Hollywood, and New York Goes to Work.
- Benzino – former cast member of Love & Hip Hop: Atlanta and Marriage Boot Camp: Reality Stars.
- Jennifer Williams – former cast member of Basketball Wives.
- Claudia Jordan – former cast member of The Real Housewives of Atlanta, Celebrity Apprentice, and Celebrity Apprentice All-Stars.
- Laura Govan – former cast member of Basketball Wives LA.
- Karamo Brown – former cast member of The Real World: Philadelphia.

== Episodes ==
No.	Title	Original release date	U.S. viewers (millions)
1	"Second Chance at First Impression"	February 10, 2016	0.319
Claudia seeks to cleanse herself from her reality past and pitches a talk show; the cast meets at a focus group.
2	"NY Goes MIA"	February 17, 2016	0.201
The cast brainstorms ideas for Claudia's talk show; Jennifer's singing aspirations; Claudia and New York come to blows.
3	"Boo Hoo Kitty"	February 24, 2016	0.198
New York continues to not show up in meetings; Claudia throws a homecoming party.
4	"Who You Calling a B...?"	March 2, 2016	0.257
Baby Zino arrives; Laura invites New York to anger management; Jennifer goes into the studio with Benzino and Bobby Valentino
5	"Jordan vs. Williams"	March 9, 2016	N/A
Jennifer's argument with Claudia; Karamo urges his son to have better work ethic; New York gives Akt!on an ultimatum.
6	"New York State of Mind"	March 16, 2016	N/A
Benzino and Claudia don't see eye to eye about Jennifer; New York announces she won't work on the talk show.
7	"You're Fired"	March 23, 2016	0.168
Claudia gets the green light from Carlos; Jennifer's incriminating video; Laura faces eviction; Jennifer receives devastating news.
8	"That's a Wrap!"	March 23, 2016	0.168
Claudia confronts Jennifer about the controversial video; Laura quits the talk show; Carlos throws the cast and crew a wrap party.
9	"Reunion Part 1"	April 3, 2016	0.176
Carlos King hosts the two part reunion as the cast reunites. New York lashes out after a race issue.
10	"Reunion Part 2"	April 10, 2016	0.162
Claudia and Jennifer clash; Benzino and Althea appear with their newborn son. The focus group makes a special appearance.

== See also ==
- 15 minutes of fame
