= Michelle Rothschild-Patterson =

American reality television personality

- Born: Michelle Rothschild; November 17, 1951 (age 74); Syracuse, New York, U.S.
- Other name: "Sister Patterson"
- Known for: Reality television appearances
- Children: Tiffany Pollard

Michelle Rothschild-Patterson (née Rothschild; born November 17, 1951), also known as Sister Patterson, is known for her work in reality television and for being the mother of reality TV personality Tiffany "New York" Pollard, whom she has starred alongside on reality shows such as VH1's I Love New York and Family Therapy with Dr. Jenn.

== Personal life ==
Patterson was born in Syracuse, New York. She has numerous siblings, including a younger brother named Stephen. They grew up in a religious household, as their father was a pastor. She was romantically involved with Alex Pollard, whom she never married but had a daughter with. In 2008, Patterson was briefly romantically involved with I Love New York contestant Jimmy "Champion" Houston.

== Career ==
=== 2006: Appearance on Flavor of Love ===
==== Flavor of Love ====
In 2006, Patterson's daughter Tiffany Pollard was a contestant on Flavor of Love, In which American rapper Flavor Flav brought 20 female contestants into his mansion to compete for his love. Both Pollard's father, Alex, and Patterson, appeared on episode eight, as Flav wanted to spend time with the remaining girls' parents. Flav took Patterson, Pollard and Alex to the Santa Malibu Tennis Resort. On the way to the tennis resort, Patterson proclaimed that her daughter had gotten fat, which didn't faze Flav, but embarrassed Tiffany. While at the resort and later at the house, Patterson verbally fought with Flav, as she loudly expressed her objections to any possibility of her daughter marrying him.

==== Flavor of Love 2 ====
On the second season of Flavor of Love, Pollard returned to compete for his love. On episode nine, Flav once again spends time with the girls' parents. When Pollard's father, Alex, and Patterson returned, Patterson confronted Flav again for objecting his relationship with her daughter. Patterson tried to keep her daughter from being together with Flav, even faking a terminal illness. From the end of episode nine to the finale, Patterson said her final words that Flav should not marry Tiffany before leaving, even though he said if he asked, she would. On the second season reunion, Patterson was a special guest in the backstage talking about the time in the mansion, but later continued to argue with Flav.

=== 2007–2009: VH1 Appearances ===
==== I Love New York ====
I Love New York was Tiffany Pollard's first reality television series on VH1. The series was a spin-off of the relationship competition series Flavor of Love, which featured Pollard. Pollard brought Patterson onto the show to serve as her "consigliere". Patterson clashed with virtually all the contestants, feeling they were all wrong for her daughter. The show premiered on Monday, January 8, 2007 and was the most-watched series debut in VH1 history with 4.426 million viewers. Its season 1 finale brought in 4.8M million viewers and its reunion show ratings held 5.01 million viewers.

==== I Love New York 2 ====
Despite being engaged to I Love New York season 1 winner Patrick "Tango" Hunter, Pollard's engagement was soon called off. Afterwards, Pollard signed on for a second season of I Love New York. When asked if Patterson would make an appearance, Pollard responded; "Definitely, definitely. I couldn't do it without her. She's going to come down and make sure everything's in order. You know how she does it. She's going to be there for a large chunk of the show, actually." While most of the contestants were picked by Pollard, Patterson picked 5 men called the "mama's boys". Patterson had strong opinions about the other guys, that she loudly expressed. She would even later label one man a "freak" and scream at a little person. I Love New York 2 premiered on October 8, 2007 and the finale aired on December 17.

==== New York Goes to Hollywood ====
Patterson appeared in two episodes as she visited her daughter while she stayed in Hollywood trying to establish herself as an actress. While on the show, Patterson terrified her daughter's assistant, put a photo shoot in jeopardy, and later, after bringing religion into a meeting, criticized a prominent movie producer. Pollard later sent Patterson back home after she ruined a recording session by getting into an altercation with Little Jackie vocalist Imani Coppola.

=== 2016–present: Reality television comeback ===
==== Celebrity Big Brother UK ====
On January 5, 2016, Patterson's daughter entered the Celebrity Big Brother house in the United Kingdom to participate on the show's 17th season. As one of the rules the housemates were isolated from the outside world for an extended period of time, however, due to a task multiple phones were installed into the house and Patterson was granted brief communication with her daughter.

==== Family Therapy with Dr. Jenn ====
In February 2016, Patterson along with her daughter were announced as cast members on the first season of Family Therapy with Dr. Jenn. Pollard had a problem with the way her mother treated her, which could get both emotionally and physically abusive. Patterson was right away very resistant to therapy as she believed as Pollard's mother, it was her right to treat her like she did. Family Therapy premiered on March 16, 2016 on VH1.

In late April, Patterson, Pollard, and Dr. Jenn appeared as guests on Steve Harvey, where Patterson fought with host Steve Harvey, and made insensitive remarks about her daughter's miscarriage. The episode was aired on May 2, 2016. Harvey later called Patterson "full-blown crazy" and stated the entire interview "is the worst segment [he's] ever had on [his] show."

== Filmography ==
Year	Title	Notes
2006	Flavor of Love	4 episodes
2007–2008	I Love New York	Herself; 2 seasons
2008	New York Goes to Hollywood	Herself; 2 episodes
2016	Celebrity Big Brother 17 UK	Phone call, 1 episode
2016	Family Therapy with Dr. Jenn	Herself; 10 episodes
2016	Steve Harvey	Herself; 1 episode
2020	I Love New York: Reunited	Herself; 1 episode
