= Barry Mann =

American songwriter and musician (born 1939)

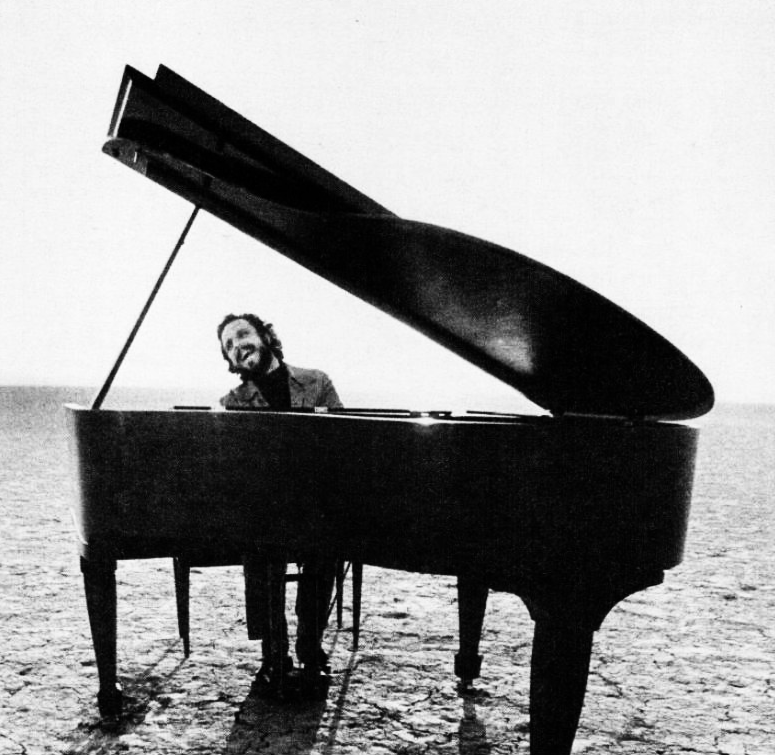
- Mann in 1974

Background information
- Born: Barry Imberman; February 9, 1939 (age 87); Brooklyn, New York City, U.S.
- Genres: Pop; country pop; rock
- Occupations: Musician; songwriter
- Instrument: Piano
- Years active: 1958–present
- Spouse: Cynthia Weil (m. 1961; died 2023)

Barry Mann (born Barry Imberman; February 9, 1939) is an American songwriter and musician, and was part of a successful songwriting partnership with his wife, Cynthia Weil.

He has written or co-written 53 hits in the UK and 98 in the US.

== Early life ==
Mann was born Barry Imberman on February 9, 1939, to a Jewish family in Brooklyn. He was born two days before fellow songwriter Gerry Goffin.

== Career ==
His first successful song as a writer was "She Say (Oom Dooby Doom)", a Top 20 chart-scoring song composed for the band The Diamonds in 1959. Mann co-wrote the song with Mike Anthony (Michael Logiudice). He wrote Footsteps recorded by Steve Lawrence in 1960. In 1961, Mann had his greatest success to that point with "I Love How You Love Me", written with Larry Kolber and a No. 5 scoring single for the band The Paris Sisters (seven years later, Bobby Vinton's version would reach the Top 10). The same year, Mann himself reached the Top 40 as a performer with a novelty song co-written with Gerry Goffin, "Who Put the Bomp", which parodied the nonsense words of the then-popular doo-wop genre.

Despite his success as a singer, Mann chose to channel his creativity into songwriting, forming a prolific partnership with Weil, a lyricist he met while both were staff songwriters at Don Kirshner and Al Nevin's company Aldon Music, whose offices were located in Manhattan, near the composing-and-publishing factory the Brill Building. Mann and Weil, who married in 1961, developed some songs intended to be socially conscious, with successes such as "Uptown" by The Crystals, "We Gotta Get out of This Place" by the Animals, "Magic Town" by The Vogues, and "Kicks" by Paul Revere & the Raiders. Mann and Weil were disturbed when "Only In America", a song they had written with the team of Jerry Leiber and Mike Stoller and conceived originally for and recorded by the Drifters as a protest against racial prejudice, was re-worked by Leiber and Stoller into an uncontroversial success for Jay & The Americans.

As of May 2009, Mann's song catalog lists 635 songs. He has received 56 popular music, country, and Rhythm & Blues awards from Broadcast Music Inc., and 46 Millionaire Awards for radio performances numbering more than one million plays. The song "You've Lost That Lovin' Feelin'", co-written with Weil and Phil Spector, was the most played song of the 20th century, with more than 14 million plays.

Mann has composed songs for movies, most notably "Somewhere Out There", co-written with Weil and James Horner, for the 1986 animated movie An American Tail. Linda Ronstadt and James Ingram performed the song as a duet during the movie's closing credits; their version was released as a single, which scored No. 2 on the Billboard chart and became a "gold"-scoring record. "Somewhere Out There" would win two 1987 Grammy Awards, as Song of the Year and Best Song Written for a Motion Picture or Television. "Somewhere Out There" was also nominated for a 1986 Oscar as best song, but lost to "Take My Breath Away" from Top Gun (a film that featured the Weil-penned "You've Lost That Lovin' Feelin'" in a key scene). Mann's other movie work includes the scores for I Never Sang for My Father and Muppet Treasure Island, and songs for National Lampoon's Christmas Vacation and Oliver & Company.

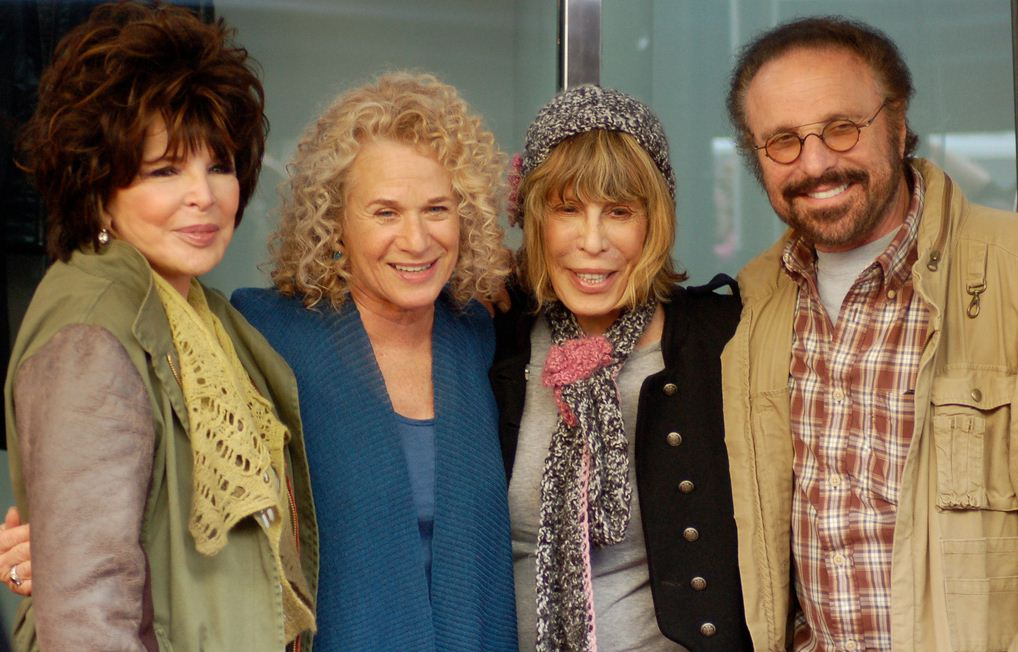
Carole Bayer Sager, Carole King, Cynthia Weil, and Mann in 2012

Mann co-wrote, with Dan Hill, the song "Sometimes When We Touch", which scored No. 3 on the Billboard Hot 100.

In 1987, Mann and Weil were inducted into the Songwriters Hall of Fame. In 2011, they received the Johnny Mercer Award, the greatest honor from the Songwriters Hall of Fame.

Mann and Weil were named among the 2010 recipients of Ahmet Ertegun Award from the Rock and Roll Hall of Fame. Mann and Weil operated a publishing company named Dyad Music.

== Personal life ==
Mann was married to Cynthia Weil from 1961 until her death in 2023. They had one daughter, Jenn. They resided in Beverly Hills, California.

== Discography ==
=== Albums ===
Year	Album	Record label
1961	Who Put the Bomp	ABC-Paramount
1969	Angel, Angel, Down We Go	Tower Records
1971	Lay It All Out	New Design Records
1975	Survivor	RCA Victor
1980	Barry Mann	Casablanca Records
2000	Soul & Inspiration	Atlantic Records

=== Singles ===
Year	Title	Peak chart positions		Record label	B-side	Album
Year	Title	US Pop	US AC	Record label	B-side	Album
1959	"All the Things You Are"	—	—	JDS Records	"A Love to Last a Lifetime"	—
1960	"War Paint"	—	—	ABC-Paramount Records	"Counting Teardrops"	Who Put the Bomp
1961	"Happy Birthday, Broken Heart"	—	—	ABC-Paramount Records	"The Millionaire"	Who Put the Bomp
1961	"Who Put the Bomp (in the Bomp, Bomp, Bomp)"	7	—	ABC-Paramount Records	"Love, True Love"	Who Put the Bomp
1961	"Little Miss U.S.A."	109	—	ABC-Paramount Records	"Find Another Fool"	—
1962	"Hey Baby I'm Dancin'"	—	—	ABC-Paramount Records	"Like I Don’t Love You"	—
1962	"Teenage Has-Been"	—	—	ABC-Paramount Records	"Bless You"	—
1963	"Graduation Time"	—	—	Colpix Records	"Johnny Surfboard"	—
1964	"Talk to Me Baby"	94	—	Red Bird Records	"Amy"	—
1966	"Angelica"	111	—	Capitol Records	"Looking at Tomorrow"	—
1967	"Where Do I Go From Here"	—	—	Capitol Records	"She Is Today"	—
1968	"The Young Electric Psychedelic Hippie Flippy Folk and Funky Philosophic Turned On Groovy 12 String Band"	—	—	Capitol Records	"Take Your Love"	—
1968	"I Just Can't Help Believin'"	—	—	Capitol Records	"Where Do I Go From Here"	—
1970	"Feelings"	93	—	Scepter Records	"Let Me Stay With You"	—
1971	"Carry Me Home"	—	—	New Design Records	"Sundown"	—
1971	"When You Get Right Down to It"	—	—	New Design Records	"Don’t Give Up on Me"	Lay It All Out
1972	"Too Many Mornings"	—	—	New Design Records	"On Broadway"	Lay It All Out
1974	"Nobody but You"	—	—	RCA Victor	"Woman Woman Woman"	Survivor
1975	"Nothing Good Comes Easy"	—	—	RCA Victor	"Woman Woman Woman"	Survivor
1975	"I'm a Survivor"	—	—	RCA Victor	"Don't Seem Right"	—
1976	"The Princess and the Punk"	—	—	Arista Records	"Jennifer"	—
1977	"The Best That I Know How"	—	—	United Artists Records	"Lettin' the Good Time Get Away"	—
1979	"Almost Gone"	—	—	Warner Bros. Records	"For No Reason at All"	—
1980	"Brown-Eyed Woman"	—	—	Casablanca Records	"In My Own Way"	Barry Mann
