= Patrick S. Hunter =

American actor

Patrick "Tango" Hunter
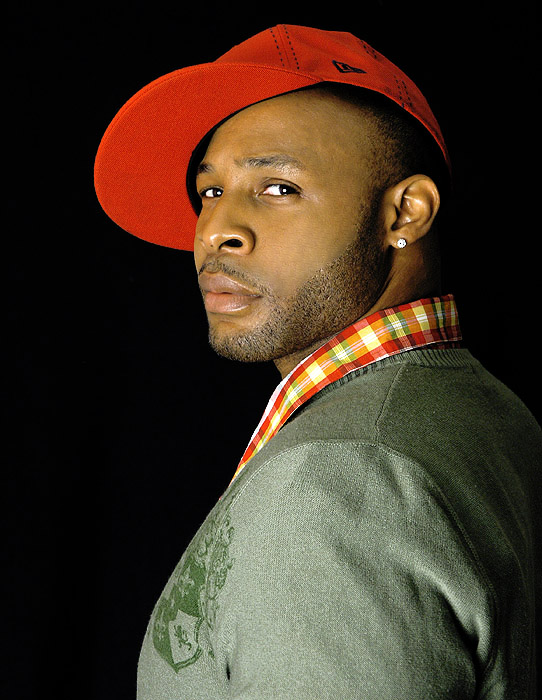
- Born: Patrick Samuel Hunter; July 30, 1979 (age 46); Tampa, Florida, United States
- Occupations: Actor, activist, music consultant
- Known for: First season winner of I Love New York

Patrick Samuel "Tango" Hunter (born July 30, 1979) is an American actor, activist and music consultant. He is best known for his role on VH1's The Bachelor-style dating show I Love New York and was the winner of the 20 contenders vying for the affections of Tiffany "New York" Pollard in the first season of the series. During the show, Hunter was considered the rough, yet sensitive suitor. Before his appearance on the reality show, Hunter was a songwriter and co-owner of a Tampa, Florida-based independent record label.

== The Reunion ==
First aired on April 15, 2007 (5.01 million viewers).

The I Love New York reunion show is considered to be the most chaotic reunion shows in reality TV history. Hunter and Pollard reunited to Macy Gray's "Glad You're Here" after not being able to see each other after the finale. Hunter became upset after watching the show and the comments Pollard made during the season's penultimate episode about his mother being too plain and overweight. He broke up with Pollard onstage, stating that she was not able to show her true personality to him like he wanted. Pollard attempted to attack him and then made many insulting comments, before breaking down in tears.

When Pollard was asked if she knew in advance about Hunter's decision to end the relationship; she replied that she did not. However, it was later revealed on VH1's website that Hunter had already forgiven Pollard for her remarks about his mother, and a number of people speculated that the angry attitude about her disrespecting his mother on the reunion show was just a plot to get himself out of the relationship.

== Activism ==
Hunter has become a spokesman for various charities and foundations across the country, such as the Jules Burt Foundation for Autism, which is a non-profit organization created by artist Jules Burt. The Jules Burt Foundation's mission is to raise awareness and spread resources to those affected by autism.
