= House of Villains season 1 =

House of Villains
- Season 1
- Hosted by: Joel McHale
- No. of contestants: 10
- Winner: Tanisha Thomas
- Runner-up: Johnny Bananas

Release
- Original network: E!
- Original release: October 12 – December 21, 2023

Season chronology
- Next → Season 2

The first season of the television reality program House of Villains premiered on E! on October 12, 2023, and concluded on December 21, 2023. This season is hosted by Joel McHale and features a cast of reality television's most memorable and notorious villains. Contestants live in a house while competing in challenges for power and safety, voting to banish each other until the last villain remaining wins a $200,000 cash prize and the title of America's Ultimate Supervillain. Tanisha Thomas won the season, defeating Johnny Bananas and Anfisa Arkhipchenko.

== Contestants ==
The cast of 10 reality show villains was announced on August 15, 2023.

Cast member	Original series	Finish
Tanisha Thomas	Bad Girls Club 2	Winner
Johnny Bananas	The Real World: Key West	Runner-up
Anfisa Arkhipchenko	90 Day Fiance 4	3rd place
Jonny Fairplay	Survivor: Pearl Islands	4th place
Abhishek "Shake" Chatterjee	Love Is Blind 2	5th place
Omarosa Manigault Newman	The Apprentice 1	6th place
Bobby Lytes	Love & Hip Hop: Miami	7th place
Corinne Olympios	The Bachelor 21	8th place
Tiffany "New York" Pollard	Flavor of Love 1	9th place
Jax Taylor	Vanderpump Rules	10th place

Carole Baskin, Abby Lee Miller, Spencer Pratt, Ben Robinson, and Danielle Staub made guest appearances during the first season.

== Voting history ==
Color key:

Winner
Runner-up
Third place
Supervillain of the Week
Hit List Nominee
Redemption Winner
Eliminated

	Episode							
	1/2/3	3/4	5/6	7/8	9	10		
Supervillain of the Week	Omarosa	Bananas	Omarosa	Bobby	Bananas	Bananas	—N/a	
Hit List Nominees	Corinne; Jax; Shake	Anfisa; Bobby; Tiffany	Corinne; Shake; Tanisha	Bananas; Bobby (Note: Bobby originally won Supervillain of the Week but decided to nominate himself on the Hit List.); Shake	Fairplay; Omarosa	Anfisa; Fairplay; Shake	—N/a	
Redemption Winner	Shake	Bobby	Shake	Bananas	—N/a	Anfisa	—N/a	
Tanisha	Jax	Tiffany	Hit List	Bobby	Omarosa	No Vote (Note: For this round there was no banishment vote. Instead, whichever two villains remained on The Hit List after losing the Redemption Challenge were automatically banished.)	Winner (Episode 10)	
Bananas	Jax	Supervillain of the Week	Corinne	Bobby	Supervillain of the Week	Supervillain of the Week	Runner-up (Episode 10)	
Anfisa	Jax	Hit List	Corinne	Shake	Fairplay	No Vote	Third place (Episode 10)	Tanisha (Note: As Anfisa received no votes to win, she broke the jury's tie to determine the winner.)
Fairplay	Jax	Tiffany	Corinne	Bobby	Hit List	Banished (Episode 10)	Bananas	
Shake	Jax	Anfisa	Corinne	Hit List	Omarosa	Banished (Episode 10)	Bananas	
Omarosa	Supervillain of the Week	Tiffany	Supervillain of the Week	Shake	Hit List	Banished (Episode 9)	Tanisha	
Bobby	Jax	Anfisa	Corinne	~~Supervillain~~; ~~of the Week~~	Banished (Episode 8)		N/A (Note: Bobby was not present with the jury for the finale and therefore did not cast a jury vote for one of the final three.)	
Bobby	Jax	Anfisa	Corinne	Hit List	Banished (Episode 8)		N/A	
Corinne	Hit List	Tiffany	Hit List	Banished (Episode 6)			Bananas	
Tiffany	Jax	Hit List	Banished (Episode 4)				Tanisha	
Jax	Hit List	Banished (Episode 3)					Tanisha	
Banished	Jax; 7 of 7 votes to Banish	Tiffany; 4 of 6 votes to Banish	Corinne; 5 of 5 votes to Banish	Bobby; 3 of 5 votes to Banish	Omarosa; 2 of 3 votes to Banish	Fairplay; Lost the Redemption; Challenge	Anfisa; 0 of 6 votes to Win	Bananas; 3 of 7 votes to Win
Banished	Jax; 7 of 7 votes to Banish	Tiffany; 4 of 6 votes to Banish	Corinne; 5 of 5 votes to Banish	Bobby; 3 of 5 votes to Banish	Omarosa; 2 of 3 votes to Banish	Shake; Lost the Redemption; Challenge	Tanisha; 4 of 7 votes to Win	

== Episodes ==
No. overall	No. in season	Title	Original release date	U.S. viewers (millions)
1	1	"Welcome to the House of Villains"	October 12, 2023	0.57 (Note: Combined total viewers from simultaneous airings of the series premiere on E!, Bravo, Syfy, and USA Network.)
Battle Royale Challenge (Balls Out): Each contestant has a giant ball with their face on it in an arena. They must attempt to push their opponent's balls out of the arena while preventing their own ball from being pushed out. The last contestant to have their ball remain in the arena wins.
2	2	"The Lesser of Three Evils"	October 19, 2023	0.20
Redemption Challenge (Blind Trust): Contestants must drive a golf cart through a course while blindfolded, being directed by another contestant of their choice. The contestant with the fastest time wins.
3	3	"Secret Identities"	October 26, 2023	0.16
Battle Royale Challenge (Two Faced): Wearing a mask and costume, and fitted with voice changers, contestants attend a masquerade party along with several masked extras. During the party, contestants attempt to identify other contestants while attempting to conceal their own identity. The contestant who correctly identifies most of their fellow contestants wins.
4	4	"Dance with the Devil"	November 2, 2023	0.18
Redemption Challenge (Hidden Agenda): During their confessionals, the three nominated contestants are given the details of the challenge in secret. They must complete as many listed tasks as possible without being noticed by the rest of the house. There is a four-hour time limit which expires when guest Abby Lee Miller arrives at the house to announce the results. The contestant with the most tasks completed wins.
5	5	"Shake Showdown"	November 9, 2023	0.19
Battle Royale Challenge (Cold and Calculated): Each contestant starts with a chest latched with three locks. Throughout the challenge, contestants break through ice cubes to obtain either a lock or key frozen inside. If they find a key, they can unlock one of their locks. If they find a lock, they can add it to an opponent's chest to slow them down. The first contestant to unlock all of their locks and open their chest wins.
6	6	"The Gospel Truth"	November 16, 2023	0.20
Redemption Challenge (Darkest Hour): Contestants enter a dark room and must stick their hands in enclosures of live animals including snakes, rats and scorpions to search for tokens. After finding each token, they can assign it to an opponent; contestants are eliminated from the challenge once they are assigned five tokens. The last contestant standing wins.
7	7	"Pride Cometh Before the Fall"	November 30, 2023	0.25
Battle Royale Challenge (Power Trip): One contestant is randomly chosen to be handcuffed to a briefcase, and must choose another contestant to be handcuffed to the briefcase in their place, with this selection process continuing until only one contestant has not been selected. The last contestant to remain unselected wins the contents of the case, which was revealed as the power to elect another contestant to become the Supervillain of the Week.
8	8	"Three Villains Walk into a Bar...Ouch"	December 7, 2023	0.18
Redemption Challenge (Cap It Off): Played across seven rounds. Each round, contestants are shown a photo of a moment during the season and attempt to come up with a humorous caption for the photo. The captions are then presented anonymously to the four non-competing contestants, who vote on the most humorous caption, with most-voted caption winning the round. The contestant who wins the most rounds wins.
9	9	"One Less Rat in This House to Deal With"	December 14, 2023	0.15
Battle Royale Challenge (Blow by Blow): Contestants use a leaf blower to blow balls of their assigned color into holes worth varying points around the backyard. Inside the house is also a "Frozen Up" (FU) hole; if a contestant has one of their balls blown into this hole, they cannot participate for the remainder of the challenge. The contestant with the most points at the end of 15 minutes wins.
10	10	"Heavy Is the Head That Wears the Crown"	December 21, 2023	0.19
At the start of the episode, eliminated contestants (with the exception of Bobby) returned to the house and it was revealed that the winner of the season would be determined by a jury vote. The winner of the Battle Royale Challenge would automatically make it to the finale, joined by the contestant they did not nominate on the Hit List. The three contestants on the Hit List would then compete in the Redemption Challenge for the final spot in the finale, with the two losing contestants eliminated.: Battle Royale Challenge (The Last Supper): Contestants are presented with five dishes worth different dollar amounts: boiled egg ($10), spicy chicken wing ($20), red snapper eyeball ($30), bull testicles ($40) and lamb brain pie ($50). They must order $200 worth of food, to be prepared and served by Below Deck chef Ben Robinson, and fully consume their order in addition to one chocolate donut. The first contestant to consume their order wins.; Redemption Challenge (Who Said It?): Contestants are presented with seven quotes said by other contestants during the season and attempt to guess which contestants said them to earn points. The contestant with the most points wins and claims the final spot in the finale.
