= Flavor of Love season 2 =

Season of television series

Flavor of Love
- Season 2
- The cast of Flavor of Love (2 not pictured)
- Starring: Flavor Flav
- No. of episodes: 12

Release
- Original network: VH1
- Original release: August 6 – October 29, 2006

Season chronology
- ← Previous; Season 1 Next → Season 3

The second season of the VH1 reality television series Flavor of Love brings female contestants into the mansion of Flavor Flav to compete for his love. The second season first aired weekly from August 6, 2006 to October 29, 2006, with a total of twelve episodes.

During the first season reunion, Hoopz announced that her relationship with Flavor Flav was over, saying "It's like that, but it's not like that." When discussing the upcoming season, Flav emphatically told the producers "No more gold diggers!" (referring mainly to Hottie from Season 1).

Filming began in the summer of 2006 and consisted of an 11 episode season, with another episode for a reunion show. VH1 uploaded videos of contestant auditions on IFilm and encouraged viewers to rank the contestants.

The show premiered with 3.3 million viewers. The format of the show largely stayed the same as the first season, with the exception of Flav's deliberations with Big Rick as to whom he would keep or send home before the actual ceremony; this angle was dropped during the second season. The second series' season finale was the second highest non-sports basic cable program of the year drawing over 7.5 million viewers which is the highest rated show in VH1 history.

On November 28, 2006, the complete second season was released on DVD.

== Contestants ==
Contestant	Real Name	Hometown	Finish	Place
Saaphyri (Note: Never received a nickname)	Saaphyri Windsor	Los Angeles, California	Episode 1	21 (DQ)
Eye'z	Bonnie Mercado	Manhattan, New York	Episode 1	20-16
Hood	Alkeisha "Yanay" Phillips †	Compton, California	Episode 1	20-16
Bamma	Tarashai Lee	Bessemer, Alabama	Episode 1	20-16
Choclate	Ronnise Clark	Denham Springs, Louisiana	Episode 1	20-16
H-Town	Renee Austin	Dallas, Texas	Episode 1	20-16
Spunkeey	Maria Dunbar	Marietta, Georgia	Episode 2	15-14
Wire	Jesselynn Desmond	Palm Springs, California	Episode 2	15-14
Somethin	Tykeisha Thomas	Norwalk, California	Episode 3	13-12
Tiger	Britnay Morano	West Hills, California	Episode 3	13-12
Payshintz	Jasmine Dare	Taipei, Taiwan	Episode 3	11 (quit)
Toasteee	Jennifer Toof	Havertown, Pennsylvania	Episode 4	10
Like Dat	Darra Boyd	Boerum Hill, New York	Episode 5	9
Nibblz	Domenique Majors	East Flatbush, New York	Episode 6	8-7
Beatuful	Kelly Jenkins	Chicago, Illinois	Episode 6	8-7
Buckwild	Becky Johnston	Upland, California	Episode 6	6 (quit)
Buckeey	Shay Johnson	Atlanta, Georgia	Episode 7	5
Bootz	Larissa Hodge	Corona, California	Episode 8	4
Krazy	Heather Crawford	Martinsburg, West Virginia	Episode 9	3
New York	Tiffany Pollard	Utica, New York	Episode 11	2
Deelishis	Chandra Davis	Detroit, Michigan	Episode 11	1

== Call-out order ==
Order	Episodes									
Order	1	2	3	4	5	6	7	8	9	11 (Note: Episode 10 was a recap episode.)
1	Buckeey	Like Dat	Krazy	Krazy	Bootz	Deelishis	New York	New York	Deelishis	Deelishis
2	Buckwild	Krazy	Beatuful	Deelishis	Krazy	Bootz	Deelishis	Deelishis	New York	New York
3	Krazy	Deelishis	Like Dat	Buckeey	Buckeey	Buckeey	Bootz	Krazy	Krazy	
4	Tiger	Toasteee	Toasteee	Beatuful	Buckwild	Krazy	Krazy	Bootz		
5	Payshintz	Payshintz	Deelishis	Bootz	Deelishis	New York	Buckeey			
6	Nibblz	Nibblz	Buckwild	Buckwild	Nibblz	Buckwild				
7	Deelishis	Beatuful	Nibblz	Like Dat	Beatuful	Nibblz; Beatuful				
8	Wire	Buckwild	Buckeey	Nibblz	Like Dat	Nibblz; Beatuful				
9	Like Dat	Buckeey	Bootz	Toasteee						
10	Bootz	Bootz	Payshintz							
11	Toasteee	Tiger	Tiger; Somethin							
12	Beatuful	Somethin	Tiger; Somethin							
13	Somethin	Wire; Spunkeey								
14	Spunkeey	Wire; Spunkeey								
15	H-Town; Choclate; Bamma; Hood; Eye'z									
16	H-Town; Choclate; Bamma; Hood; Eye'z									
17	H-Town; Choclate; Bamma; Hood; Eye'z									
18	H-Town; Choclate; Bamma; Hood; Eye'z									
19	H-Town; Choclate; Bamma; Hood; Eye'z									
20	Saaphyri									

The contestant quit the competition
The contestant was disqualified from the competition
The contestant entered the competition
The contestant was eliminated.

== Episodes ==
=== Somethin's Stinkin' in the House of Flav ===
First aired August 6, 2006

Twenty new contestants arrive at the mansion and discover that there were only fourteen beds. When H-Town and Saaphyri fight over a bed, Flav asked them what happened. After finding out who started the fight, Saaphyri is disqualified for physically assaulting H-Town. Flav revealed that he had a spy in his house; this turned out to be Eye'z. She told Flav that Bamma is too quiet, Somethin is crazy, Hood was sent to the show by her agent, Wire was on The 5th Wheel, Tiger wasn't into Flav, Choclate didn't say much, and Toasteee drinks too much. Later, Somethin shared an intimate moment with Flav, and Spunkeey called her out and snitches on Somethin for lesbian statements she made before. Somethin erupted and begins to scream; the producers added a demonic voice for humorous effect. Spunkeey also gets into it with Toastee, when she snitches on and calls out Toastee for being quote, "tipsy". After the five girls Hood, Bamma, H-Town, Choclate and Saaphyri were eliminated, the contestants discovered that Somethin had defecated on the floor during the elimination ceremony because she couldn't hold it in or go to the bathroom.

- Eliminated: Hood, Bamma, H-town, Choclate, Saaphyri

Reasons For Elimination

- Hood: Agent sent her to be on the show.
- Bamma: Flav said that he wasn't feeling her.
- H-Town: Saaphryi physically assaulted H-Town, so Flav told her to go to a doctor for her injuries.
- Choclate: Flav claims that he wasn't feeling her.
- Saaphryi: Got disqualified for assaulting H-Town over a bed.

=== Flav is Blind ===
First aired August 13, 2006

Flav challenges the remaining fourteen Flavorettes to a blind speed dating competition so he could get to know them without appearance being a factor. Things fell apart when Flav realized he couldn't eat something he couldn't see. The girls were each given ten minutes to leave a lasting impression on Flav as he stumbled from table to table. In the end, Flav chose Tiger, Like Dat, and Buckwild as the winners while indulging in a bucket of KFC.

The next day, the three girls who won the speed dating competition accompanied Flav on a group date to the "gonzoleers" (gondolas) in the LBC. Flavor Flav tried to stick to the tradition of kissing all the girls as they passed under the bridges, however Tiger had no interest in kissing him. She claimed that she didn't like kissing him after other girls. Later that evening, Flav had a mixer, and all went well until Wire watched Buckeey and Flavor Flav kiss. She stood there until Flav asked her to go inside. She then played the piano very loudly and ruined Buckeey's date. Toasteee gave Flavor Flav advice on whom he should eliminate, and he took this into consideration that night in the elimination ceremony. Wire and Spunkeey were both eliminated. Spunkeey cried hard when she was eliminated and was sad that he kept "the beauty queen over her" and the "girls who want to have sex with other girls". She also said "I would have shitted on your floor if I had to" as she hugged Flav goodbye.

- Challenge: Blind speed dating competition.
- Challenge Winners: Tiger, Like Dat, Buckwild
- Bottom Three: Somethin, Wire, Spunkeey
- Eliminated: Wire, Spunkeey

Reasons For Elimination

- Spunkeey: Acted too fake around him.
- Wire: Flav claims he wasn't feeling her.

=== She Works Hard for Her Honey ===
First aired August 20, 2006

Flav divides the girls into two groups. The first group (consisting of Buckwild, Krazy, Toasteee, Somethin, Bootz, and Deelishis) is assigned to work at M&M Soul Food, one of Flav's favorite restaurants. Somethin gets fired for not taking the challenge seriously, and Bootz wins the challenge. The next day, the second group (consisting of Buckeey, Tiger, Payshintz, Nibblz, Beatuful and Like Dat) finds out that they have to clean a disgusting house after a crazy party the night before, which turns out to belong to hip-hop legend Warren G. While the girls in the second group are cleaning, back at the mansion Buckwild, Krazy and Deelishis watch as Bootz and Somethin are arguing. The winner is Nibblz, and she and Flav have a king and queen dinner. Bootz and Payshintz then start fighting. Many of the other girls joined in and started making racial comments, furthermore accusing her of not knowing who she or Flav is. Bootz tells Flav that Tiger, Somethin, and Payshintz should all go home. Flav takes this into consideration, and eliminates Tiger and Sumthin. He has a clock for Payshintz as well, but she chooses not to accept it because she couldn't take the drama with Bootz, and a few of the other girls anymore.

- Challenge: To work at one of Flav's favorite restaurants (six girls). Clean the house of one of Flav's friends (six other girls).
- Challenge Winner: Bootz (Group 1), Nibblz (Group 2)
- Bottom Three: Payshintz, Tiger, Somethin
- Eliminated: Tiger, Somethin
- Quit: Payshintz

Reasons For Elimination

- Somethin: Flav couldn't get over her defecating on the floor, and she didn't take the challenge seriously.
- Tiger: Didn't make a connection with her.
- Payshintz: Quit the competition because she couldn't handle the drama with Bootz and a few of the other girls.

=== Jelly on the Telly ===
First aired August 27, 2006

The episode begins on the night of the previous elimination, when Toasteee and Nibblz share Flav's bed that night. In the morning, Flav holds a hip-hop dance contest. The girls are divided into three teams of three each. Krazy, Nibblz, and Deelishis end up winning. Each girl gets a private date with Flav; that night, Krazy goes with him on a romantic candlelit dinner to KFC, Nibblz spends the next morning in his bedroom and has breakfast with him, and Deelishis goes with him to a strawberry field.

In the meantime, Toasteee spreads a rumor to the other girls that the night before, she heard noises and concluded that Nibblz was "jacking Flav off". Nibblz, offended by this rumor, retaliates by revealing to Flav that Toasteee apparently admitted that she has done pornography on the internet and in a magazine. Toasteee denies the allegations, so Flav does some internet research to see who's lying. Toasteee goes to Flav, letting him know that she's leaving because she can't handle the drama anymore. Flav tells Toasteee that if she leaves now, she's basically implying that Nibblz was right. Toasteee agrees to stay. In that evening's eliminations, Flav has both girls promise they're telling the truth, but right after that, he holds up a pornographic picture of Toasteee, which shocks everyone. Toasteee claims that it's not necessarily evidence against her as she leaves, and points out that Nibblz is both a stripper and pornstar, too. Flav then tells Toasteee that Nibblz has quote, "always kept it real with me". Flav states at elimination, that he has no problem with Toasteee doing porn per se, but eliminated her for lying about it.

- Challenge: A hip-hop dance contest divided by three teams.
- Challenge Winners: Krazy, Nibblz, Deelishis
- Bottom two: Nibblz, Toasteee
- Eliminated: Toasteee

Reasons For Elimination

- Toasteee: Lied to Flav about doing porn.

=== Famous Friends and Strangeness ===
First aired September 3, 2006

This episode starts with Like Dat and Bootz confronting Buckwild about her speech patterns, claiming that she is talking like she's black and that it isn't how she really talks, but Buckwild insists that she's not a fake. At breakfast, during which Buckeey comments on Like Dat's slovenly table manners, the girls find out that they must throw a party for some of Flav's famous friends. Bootz, Buckeey, Deelishis, Like Dat, and Buckwild get into an argument about Buckeey and Deelishis not working hard. After all the arguments, the girls are excited to find out who will be coming to the party. The special guests are Three 6 Mafia, Warren G, Don Magic Juan, DJ Quik, the Ying Yang Twins, and Lloyd Banks and Young Buck of G-Unit. When the guests first arrive Bootz entertain them with her booty dancing, and Nibblz gives them lap dances. The Ying Yang Twins ask Bootz to dance in one of their videos and she declines because she didn't want to risk her relationship with Flav. During the party, Nibblz drinks too much liquor and is in the bathroom vomiting, resulting in Like Dat having to lay her down on her bed. Also, Three 6 Mafia asks Krazy to sing any of Flav's songs. She says she knows one of them, but she can't sing it. Bootz and Krazy argue about Krazy's authenticity. Like Dat, Bootz, and Buckwild then get into the same argument again, about Buckwilds urban speech and Buckwild "talking like shes black". Buckwild says that when she is around different races of people, her voice changes. She then wants to leave but Like Dat convinces her to stay. Like Dat and Buckwild try to make up. Flav spends time with Buckeey, Bootz, and Like Dat before elimination. However, Like Dat is sent home because Flav only sees her as a friend. Buckwild is happy to see Like Dat go home, because Like Dat was quote, "picking on my ass". The girls are then pissed to find out that another guest will be joining them tomorrow: Season 1's Tiffany "New York" Pollard.

- Challenge: To throw a party and interact with some of Flav's friends.
- Challenge winner: None
- Eliminated: Like Dat

Reasons For Elimination

- Like Dat: Only saw her as a friend.

=== Photo Shoot To The Death ===
First aired September 10, 2006

The episode begins the night, that Flav welcomes Season 1's Tiffany Pollard aka New York back to the house as a guest to help him decide about tomorrow night's eliminations for the seven remaining ladies. All the girls are pissed that New York returned to the house, because they hold New York in contempt. Flav leaves the girls alone and New York asks the girls about each other. They all express disgust with New Yorks presence, and Bootz lets New York know that she doesn't like her and doesn't want her there and that she's just another bitch trying to steal her man. New York and Bootz get into an argument, where New York calls Bootz a "dreamer" meaning she's just dreaming of Flav being her man, which Deelishis and Krazy find amusing. The next day, the girls wake up and are told to go to a photoshoot for URB Magazine. New York is in charge of how the women look. New York starts bullying everybody because they were late and screams to them to come down stairs. New York gets into an argument with Bootz when Bootz is late coming downstairs for the evaluation. New York has mean things to say to all of the girls (except Deelishis and Beautiful).

The girls head to the photoshoot and New York is once again giving the girls mean comments. After the photoshoot, Buckwild and New York argue over Buckwild acting "darker than what she is". When Flav steps in, he comments that Buckwild looks like she "has an attitude". Buckwild tells him that its because New York is pissing her off by accusing her of acting "darker than she is" and telling her shes "uneducated". New York at first denied it, but when Nibblz reminded her that she called Buckwild "ignorant", Flav takes Buckwild's side. New York runs out crying and feels disrespected by Flav. All the girls are happy when New York storms out, while Flav brings her back. Meanwhile, the girls are upset that New York is there and Krazy decides to call her out. The two fight because Krazy is saying that New York is not in control of elimination and New York starts physically bullying Krazy by going on top of the table and touching her on the forehead, and then trying to pull out a chair from underneath Krazy, which lead Flav to come and stop it, by telling everybody that nobody is in charge of eliminations except him.

Flav then takes New York and asks her about each of the girls. She wonders if Buckwild is actually there to be in a romantic relationship with Flav, and that Buckwild pretends to be "ghetto", and its offensive. She feels that Buckeey lacks energy. Nibblz is filthy and too sexual. New York believes that both Bootz and Deelishis are there to be with him, while she believes that Krazy is there for the wrong reasons.

Back at the house, Krazy calls Deelishis out when Deelishis spreads the word that Krazy is fake and only there to further her singing career, to all of the girls back at the photoshoot.

At eliminations, New York states that Krazy, Beatuful and Nibblz should go home. Flav eliminates Beatuful because she is too laid back and Nibblz because she wouldn't fit with his children. Krazy gets her clock. Flav has a surprise and invites New York back as a full-time competitor. The girls are pissed and Buckwild returns her clock because New York returned and she was afraid she would violate her probation with New York there. Her urban style of speech that had been a point of contention earlier in the season disappeared during the elimination ceremony, making Flav and the other contestants certain that she had been faking it all along. Buckwild then calls out New York for "assaulting" Krazy, disrespecting Flavs mansion, smoking in the mansion, and "insulting" the other contestants and says that its not right for Flav to bring New York back, stating that if New York ever touched her forehead or attempted to pull a seat out from underneath her, the way she did Krazy, that she would quote, "bite New Yorks finger off, and shove it down New Yorks throat". And the only way she will stay is if Flav quote "ties or handcuffs New York to a bed".

- Brought back: Tiffany 'New York' Pollard
- Challenge: A photo shoot for Urb Magazine.
- Challenge winner: None
- Bottom Three: Krazy, Beatuful, Nibblz
- Eliminated: Beatuful, Nibblz
- Quit: Buckwild

Reasons For Elimination

- Beatuful: Flav said she was too laid back and not aggressive.
- Nibblz: Flav said she wasn't a good example for his kids and said that his kids won't be comfortable with their father being with a stripper.
- Buckwild: Quit the competition because she didn't want to have to deal with New York being there.

=== Boxin' Each Other Out ===
First aired September 17, 2006

Five girls remaining: New York, Krazy, Bootz, Buckeey, and Deelishis. Flav instructs them to put pictures of the two girls they think most deserve elimination into a box. They choose Krazy and New York, and as a result, neither of them get dates that evening. They pick Krazy because they think she is fake. New York is picked because she came on the show later than the others, and they felt that she wouldn't be a good mom for Flav's children. Flav takes Buckeey on a date to a bowling alley and teaches her how to bowl. For his second date, Flav has a romantic evening with Bootz in the backyard. But Bootz tells Flav that she is going to wait until she marries to have sex. Flav is shocked and upset by this. The next day, Deelishis is getting ready for her date when New York comes in and argues with her for saying that New York is fake and only there to play mind games with Flav.

Big Rick must come in to break up the fight. When New York leaves, she says that she just ruined Deelishis' date. However, Deelishis and Flav have a great time on an exotic camel ride date. Buckeey and Krazy then get into a dangerous fight when she hears Krazy talking bad about her, Bootz, and Deelishis to New York. Krazy supposedly pushes Buckeey, to which Buckeey responds by almost pushing Krazy off of the second-floor outside balcony. New York laughs and tries to break them apart, jokingly telling Buckeey, "dont kill Krazy. Flav doesnt want any corpses on his lawn". At the elimination ceremony, Buckeey is eliminated for almost killing Krazy. New York then states her plan, which is that Deelishis and Bootz will be her next "victims". She also says that Krazy thinks that they are friends, but New York is just taking advantage of her to eliminate the other girls.

- Challenge: To put pictures of the two girls they think most deserve elimination into a box.
- Challenge winners: Buckeey, Bootz, Deelishis
- Bottom two: Buckeey, Krazy
- Eliminated: Buckeey

Reasons For Elimination

- Buckeey: For assaulting Krazy by almost pushing her off the balcony.

=== Steppin' Out Flav Style ===
First aired September 24, 2006

With the four remaining women, the episode begins with Bootz and Deelishis still in their beds discussing their disdain for New York and Krazy. Then all the girls go downstairs where Rick delivers the Flav-O-Gram which New York reads. Flav pairs Deelishis and Krazy for the first date to LBC. As usual New York becomes openly upset and goes upstairs. After she leaves Deelishis snidely says that New York is a "loony" and begins to read the Flav-O-Gram aloud again and discovers that New York said slicking where the Flav-O-Gram said slicing. Soon afterward Deelishis follows New York to the balcony where she is standing visibly upset that she hasn't had a date with Flav in four days. The conversation is short but almost escalates into a confrontation after Deelishis tells New York to redirect her hostility. After the discussion Krazy and Deelishis set off for their date with Flav. When they get there Flav greets them and the two climb aboard the yacht. Flav eventually makes out with Deelishis, which upsets Krazy. But soon Deelishis leaves Flav's side, seasick. Krazy and Flav speak intimately. After they get off the yacht Flav takes the girls to the RMS Queen Mary for accommodations where the girls prepare for dinner. During dinner Flav asks Krazy how she feels about him and what she feels they share in common. When she fails to answer appropriately, he asks her to sing. She says she would love a record deal, but doesn't have the money. Afterward he asks Deelishis how she feels about him. Deelishis declares her feelings for him, through tears. Flav decides to spend the night with Deelishis. Flav turns and bids farewell to Krazy but mistakenly calls her Deelishis. Deelishis and Flav retire to their room where eventually they fall asleep together.

The next day New York and Bootz meet Flav at a winery where a woman brings them three horses. Bootz gets on her horse up immediately but New York is hesitant and panics. Eventually all three of them go for a ride through the winery fields. They stop at a beautiful spread where they sip wine and Flav tells Bootz he is really feeling her. Naturally New York is angry. Tensions rise but soon all three wind up stomping grapes together. After they shower they leave the winery and go to the Pechanga Resort and Casino where Bootz and New York prepare for dinner. During the date all Flav's attention goes to Bootz. New York feels ignored and demands attention, then storms off. Flav gives chase and asks her to spend the night with him, which New York later reveals was her plan. Bootz and New York then argue over dinner. After dinner they leave for their room and New York reveals that she again had sex with Flav.

After the two dates they are all faced yet again with the elimination ceremony. The first clock goes to New York, the second goes to Deelishis and the third goes to Krazy, despite Flav's worries about her intentions, he feels that they have a strong connection. Flav then eliminates Bootz because she said she wouldn't have sex with him until she is married. But before she leaves, she gives him her phone number for him to call her when "he gets sick of those ho's".

- Bottom two: Krazy, Bootz
- Eliminated: Bootz

Reasons For Elimination

- Bootz: Flav felt that he couldn't be with someone who was waiting until marriage to have sex with and that her connection wasn't as strong as the connection that he had with Krazy

=== Family Flavors ===
First aired October 1, 2006 (3.99M viewers)

Flav decides to have the three remaining girls' parents come over so he can get to know them. Hours before the remaining girls' parents arrive, everyone is cleaning and preparing rooms for the parents. Suddenly New York is bothering Deelishis because she believed that Deelishis intentionally took the room that New York chose her parents to stay in. Deelishis, unknowing of what New York is so upset about, has a brief confrontation with New York over who gets the room. Then Deelishis' parents arrive. Flav immediately likes Deelishis's parents. New York's parents arrive and as was shown from Season 1, New York's mother doesn't like Flav. This leads to a confrontation early on, and we discover that New York's mother will do anything to keep her daughter from being together with Flav, even fake a terminal illness. Flav then invites his six children and two grandchildren to the house to get their input on who would make a better stepmother. Flav's kids thought Krazy only told people what they want to hear and New York was too dramatic. They felt Deelishis was the most sincere. Later, he takes the women and their parents over on separate dates: Deelishis and her parents go to a magic show and dinner; Krazy, her mother, and her grandmother go to the hair salon; and Flav orders an assortment of soul food for New York and her parents. That night during elimination, Flav eliminates Krazy because he suspects she is only on the show to further her singing career. At the end, he announces that Deelishis and New York will be going to Placencia, Belize the next day. The show ends with New York's mother yelling, insisting that New York is coming home right now. New York, however, does not leave the mansion.

- Eliminated: Krazy

Reasons For Elimination

- Krazy: Flav felt that she was only on the show to promote her singing career.

=== Oh No She Didn't! ===
First aired October 8, 2006 (2.7M viewers)

This episode shows highlights of the second season with unseen footage. The pivotal quote of perhaps the entire series took place during the unseen footage aired on this episode. New York's mother, Michelle, told Deelishis that her posterior was so large that she was capable of moving her bowels for an entire year. Deelishis had no comment. There was a scene where Flav was in a photo shoot with some girls from Flavor of Love Season 1. He said, "I'd throw all of y'alls in my crib, except Hottie."

=== Flav Belize In Love ===
First aired October 15, 2006

The episode begins where Episode 9 ended, when Flav announced the two remaining girls were going to Placencia, Belize. New York's mother knocks on Flav's door and informs him that she is going to get her daughter out of the mansion, but gets nothing more than a rise from Flav and New York. New York's mother then ends up leaving, but not before she tells Flav that he can't marry her daughter (to which Flav responds that if he asked New York, she would marry him).

The next day it's New York's turn, and she and Flav go on a small cruise liner. There is a misunderstanding between the two when New York makes remarks that suggest that she wants to take control of his life and money; Flav thinks New York is sounding like her mother. However, later New York apologizes for what she said, and decides to accept Flav's decision-making power. That night, Flav invites her to his hotel room for a nightcap. At first she declines, but later decides that she can't put up with the hurt going on inside, and eventually accepts.

The following night, amid a rainstorm, the two girls are invited to the dock where Flav makes his final decision. Flav talks about his feelings for the two girls, both what he likes and what he dislikes. In the end, Flav decides that Deelishis is the winner. New York, angry that she lost again, starts a vulgarity-laced outburst towards Flav, resulting in the two trading insults. After mooning Flav, she says that she no longer has feelings for him and will someday find "another man who is right for me". While storming off and sobbing uncontrollably, she says to the camera, "Do I look like I give a fuck cause I don't". She also says she wishes that one day she will find the man of her dreams. Flav gives Deelishis a shiny gold grill to match his, and he says he can't wait to meet Deelishis' daughter Jasmine (as he has a daughter with the same name).

- Winner: Deelishis
- Runner up: New York

Reasons For Elimination

- New York: Flav already had a strong connection with New York and said everything was going good until they were in Belize, spending time together on the boat and said that New York sounded "like her mother" and New York has jealous ways.

=== Reunion: After the Lovin' ===
First aired October 29, 2006

The twenty-one women from the second season reunite on stage. La La hosts once again. She introduces all the girls (with the exception of Deelishis and New York, who arrive later, and Eye'z and Payshintz, who did not show up). After this introduction, La La asks Saaphyri and H-Town to come up on stage and discuss the "bed-fight" they had, after showing the tape of it. Saaphyri says she regrets it looking back on it, however, H-Town threw flowers at her, meaning she couldn't do anything about it. Saaphyri later admits to having gone to anger management classes, in consideration of Flav saying she was too violent. She later says she got a certificate, which amuses everyone. H-Town also states that looking back on it, she regrets it, but maintains that Saaphyri hit her first. Later, Goldie from the first season makes an appearance. She asks Krazy why she thought New York was her friend, explains to Krazy that when she was on season one with New York, that she and New York were cool with one and other, but she knew that she and New York were never friends. Goldie says that Somethin is strong for dealing with what happened with her on the show. She also asks Bootz, Buckwild, and Like Dat to do their booty dancing again from the fourth episode. After entertaining the crowd, La La, and the girls, Flavor Flav appears. La La asks Krazy to come up on stage, and she asks if Krazy thought being on the show helped or hurt her career. She says "it helped us all in our own way." Next, Krazy sings for Flav and appears to have mostly negative receptions.

Then Flav asks Deelishis to come out. They state that they have been apart for four months so that no one would know the outcome of the show. La La asks what Nibblz thought of his decision. She says Deelishis was a great choice for him and she has a "fabulous ass". Deelishis' daughter Jasmine meets Flav for the first time, but this moment doesn't make it onto the final edit of the show.

After a few minutes, New York is brought out. Buckwild throws a shoe at New York, which narrowly misses New York's head. La La tells Buckwild to respect her, since she never disrespected anyone and that the shoe almost hit her. Then Saaphyri throws a red bull can at New York. New York, Buckwild, Buckeey, and Saaphyri can be heard confronting each other at a distance. After this warning, La La asks Bootz whether she still wanted to say anything to New York. Bootz and New York then exchange insults, and Bootz tells New York, 'Flav only brought you back to fuck you, 'cause he left your ass twice!" Bootz then runs backstage. But security grabs Bootz, then New York and Bootz try to punch each other, while New York is screaming, "come on bitch, come on bitch bring that shit", several of the contestants attempt to intervene, and in the end Buckwild, Saaphyri, Buckeey, Bootz, and Deelishis were asked to leave. Deelishis and Saaphyri were later brought back before the reunion concluded. Deelishis and Saaphyri apologize for the brawl and Deelishis, Saaphyri, and New York exchange compliments. It was later revealed that New York would be featured on her own show, I Love New York, which premiered in January 2007. During the credits, Nibblz confronts New York about New York telling her in one episode that she needed a bra and a manicure, and tells New York that she looks like a man. New York responds, 'if I look like a man, then I look like a fabulous man, thank you very much'.

== See also ==
- List of Flavor of Love contestants

== After the show ==
- Deelishis (Chandra Davis) revealed in a special "Where Are They Now" that she and Flav were no longer dating. They did not break up in the reunion. Deelishis also appeared in Lil Waynes music video "Lollipop".
- Bootz (Larissa Aurora) and Buckeey (Shay Johnson) both appeared in Fabulous music video “Baby Don’t Go”
- Buckwild (Becky Johnston), Saaphyri Windsor, Bootz (Larissa Aurora), Buckeey (Shay Johnson), Toasteee (Jennifer Toof), Krazy (Heather Crawford), and Like Dat (Darra Boyd) appeared on VH1's Flavor of Love Girls: Charm School.
- Nibblz (Domenique) and Toasteee appeared on the first season of I Love Money.
- Saaphyri and Buckwild made a guest appearance on the third season of Flavor of Love and were selected to compete on the second season of I Love Money.
- Deelishis and Buckeey were contestants on the canceled third season of I Love Money.
- Both Buckeey and Deelishis appeared on reality show Love & Hip Hop: Atlanta. Buckeey appeared for the first two seasons as a supporting cast member and Deelishis appeared as a guest during the fifth season. In 2018, Buckeey went on to be a main cast member on Love & Hip Hop: Miami
- Hood (Yanay Yancy) died on April 21, 2024.
