= Tiffany Pollard =

American television personality (born 1982)

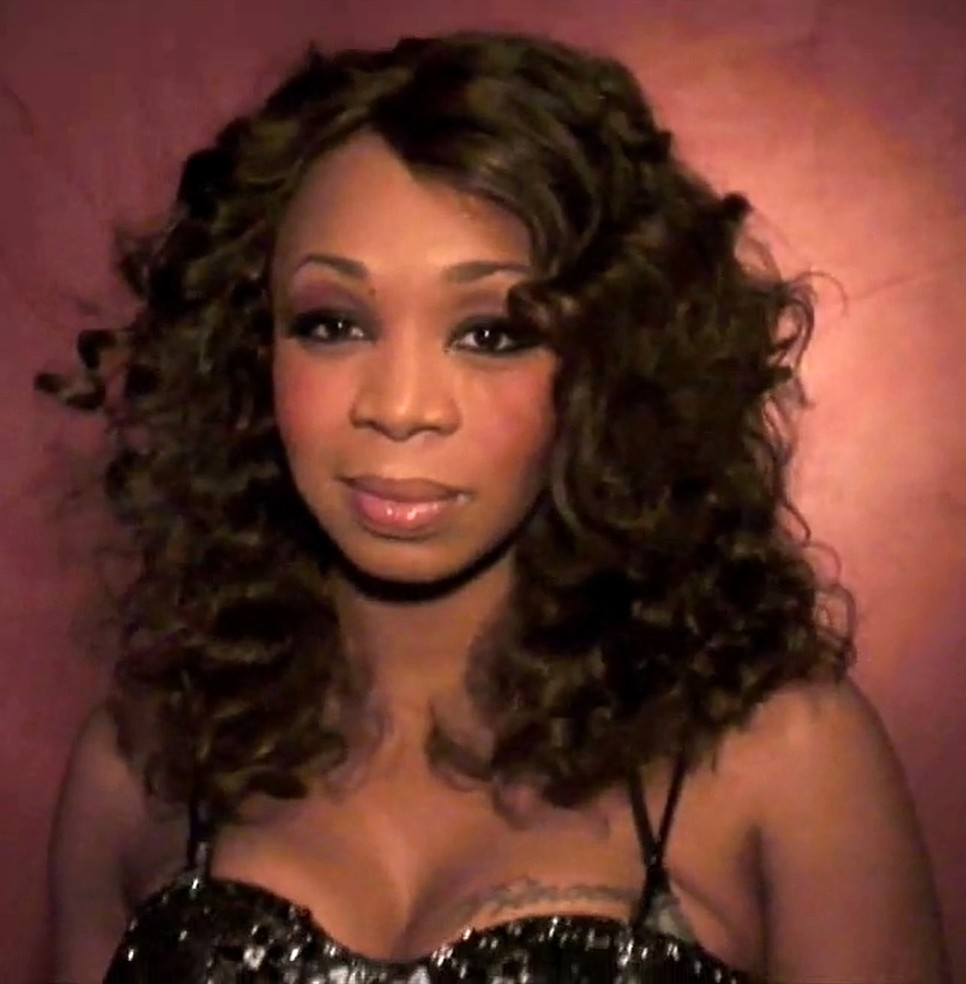
- Pollard in 2009
- Born: January 6, 1982 (age 44); Utica, New York, U.S.
- Other name: New York
- Occupations: Television personality; actress; talk show host; DJ
- Years active: 2005–present
- Mother: Michelle Rothschild-Patterson

Tiffany Pollard (born January 6, 1982) is an American television personality and actress. She (Note: Pollard uses he, she and they pronouns. This article uses she/her pronouns for consistency.) starred on the first two seasons of the reality show Flavor of Love (2006), where she was given the nickname "New York" by rapper Flavor Flav. Pollard later starred in spin-off series, including I Love New York (2007–2008) which launched a career in television. Subsequent television roles include her hosting in Brunch with Tiffany (2017–2020) and Hot Haus (2022–2023), and her roles on House of Villains (2023–2026) and College Hill: Celebrity Edition (2023).

In 2016 Pollard joined the British version of Celebrity Big Brother. She has hosted the Fenty Beauty holiday gift guide twice—once in 2018 and again in 2019—at the request of Rihanna. In January 2025, she was a contestant on a season of the cooking competition series Worst Cooks in America: Celebrity Edition.

== Early life ==
Tiffany Pollard was born in Utica, New York to Michelle Rothschild-Patterson (also known as "Sister Patterson") and Alex Pollard. Pollard has used the surnames of both her parents, despite them being unmarried. She attended John F. Kennedy Middle School and graduated from Thomas R. Proctor High School.

== Career ==
=== 2005–2006: Beginnings and Flavor of Love ===
Pollard began her television career in 2005 at the age of 23, when she was working as a clothing buyer and walking down Hollywood Boulevard. She was noticed by a casting agent from 51 Minds Entertainment, leading to her being cast in Flavor of Love, a reality television dating competition series which was filmed in late 2005 and debuted in early 2006.

While Pollard was on Flavor of Love, she had occasional clashes with other contestants. Although these clashes were, in general, nothing more than words, an incident in the penultimate episode of season one led to violence. After her elimination, an outraged Brooke "Pumkin" Thompson spat on Pollard following a heated exchange. There was extensive tension between Pollard and Thompson throughout the show. Pollard vowed to "whoop Pumkin's ass", and attempted to do so at the season one reunion. The final two contestants journeyed to Puerto Vallarta, Mexico, where Flavor Flav chose Nicole "Hoopz" Alexander over Pollard, to be his mate. However, after his relationship with Alexander did not work out, Flav decided to return for a second season of his dating show.

During the filming of Flavor of Love 2, Flav invited Pollard, then 24, to join him in helping eliminate contestants. She agreed and was later added as a participant. Pollard made it to the finale once again; however, Flav ultimately chose "Deelishis" over Pollard. The season finale was the second highest non-sports basic cable program of the year drawing over 7.5 million viewers.

=== 2007–2014: I Love New York and spin-off series ===
Before the finale of season two's Flavor of Love, Pollard had initially denied having her own show. However, after the finale aired, she announced her own dating reality show. I Love New York, a reality series focused on Pollard as she navigated a group of suitors vying for her affection, premiered on January 8, 2007. The show held a record for The Most-Watched Series Debut in VH1 history with 4.426 million viewers. The finale resulted in Pollard choosing Patrick "Tango" Hunter as her boyfriend. During the reunion episode, Hunter ended his relationship with Pollard.

51 Minds Entertainment premiered a follow-up season titled I Love New York 2 on October 8, 2007, on VH1. The second season introduced a new group of men, including George "Tailor Made" Weisgerber. During the finale episode, Tailor Made proposed to Pollard, but was turned down. During the I Love New York 2 reunion special, Tailor Made proposed a second time and Pollard accepted. In August 2008, Pollard starred in her third reality TV show New York Goes to Hollywood. The show chronicled her efforts to pursue a career in acting as well as music. Pollard appeared in the 2008 American crime comedy film First Sunday.

In February 2009, Pollard toured with the stage production of The Vagina Monologues. In May 2009, she debuted her fourth TV show New York Goes to Work. The series centered around Pollard performing a different occupation each episode and if it deemed successful by her employer, she would earn a $10,000 bonus check. Over the course of the series, Pollard earned $45,000 in bonuses, succeeding in four jobs, failing or quitting four others, and ultimately drawing in the season finale. In the series finale, viewers voted via mobile poll to choose New York's next task, and the majority selected I Love New York 3.

Production for I Love New York 3 was set to start during the first quarter of 2010; however, VH1 requested immediate cancellation of the "celebreality" franchise and shelved plans for I Love New York 3. In the summer of 2011, Pollard revealed that I Love New York 3 was shelved due to the murder-suicide case of Ryan Jenkins, who was a former contestant of Megan Wants a Millionaire. Following the halt in production, Pollard decided to take a step back from the spotlight for a period of time, marking a significant shift in her public life. After I Love New York 3 was shelved, Pollard appeared in various television series, such as DTLA and That Sex Show. In 2014, Pollard was profiled in an episode of E!'s True Hollywood Story, which revisted her rise to fame and explored her journey as a television personality.

=== 2015–2019: Resurgence ===
In April 2015, Pollard made a guest appearance on the E! Network series, Botched, where she discussed her previous breast implant surgeries and its complications. Before having surgery, Pollard threw herself a party at a hotel in Beverly Hills, to celebrate her impending transformation.

In January 2016, Pollard participated in the seventeenth season of British television reality game show Celebrity Big Brother. During the show, she misunderstood fellow contest Angie Bowie, who told Pollard that "David is dead", resulting in Pollard believing that fellow contestant David Gest had died. It was later clarified by Angie Bowie that she was talking about her ex-husband David Bowie, who had died during the show. Pollard finished the competition in fourth place. In February 2016, Pollard signed on to join the unscripted reality series The Next :15, which followed six reality television stars in their pursuit of longevity in the entertainment industry. That same year, she also joined VH1's Family Therapy with Dr. Jenn, a series led by therapist Dr. Jenn Mann that follows five celebrity families as they undergo three weeks of transformative family therapy.

In 2017, Pollard hosted her own talk show Brunch with Tiffany. The talk show followed Pollard meeting with different media public figures at restaurants for interviews. Later that year, Pollard competed in VH1's horror reality game show Scared Famous, where ten reality stars move into an estate in Savannah, Georgia, one of America's most haunted cities, as they endured challenges and scares that paid homage to recent horror hits. In June 2017, she participated in E! Network reality series Famously Single. In 2018, Pollard made a guest appearance on Braxton Family Values, where she was reunited with Flavor Flav. In the same year, she also participated in Hip Hop Squares. She also hosted the Fenty Beauty holiday gift guide in 2018 and 2019.

In 2019, Pollard became a guest judge on RuPaul's Drag Race season 11. That same year, she returned to Botched to address complications from a breast implant surgery and to remove her breast implants. She also starred on an episode of Traveling the Stars: Action Bronson and Friends Watch Ancient Aliens, a comedy-documentary series in which Action Bronson and his friends engage discussions about the content of Ancient Aliens episodes.

=== 2020–present: Expanding presence ===
In 2020, she took part in the eleventh season of Celebrity Ex on the Beach, as the ex of David McIntosh. Later that year, her YouTube series Brunch with Tiffany was picked up by VH1, making its television debut in late 2020. The pilot episode, which premiered on September 7, featured Cyn Santana and Fizz. In October 2020, after she teased that a season three of I Love New York "might happen", VH1 announced a one-off reunion special for I Love New York, which was hosted by Vivica A. Fox. The reunion returned to the series' most memorable moments and offered insights into the cast's experiences since the show aired.

In November 2020, Pollard appeared on the cover of Paper magazine's "America" issue. The issue featured an interview with Patia Borja that highlighted Pollard. A few weeks later, in December 2020, she appeared as a supporting figure in the Zeus Network reality series One Mo' Chance, where she helped Kamal "Chance" Givens, who had previously competed for Pollard's affection on I Love New York, evaluate the women competing for his affection.

In 2021, Pollard began co-starring as a companion to the titulary Ts Madison in The Ts Madison Experience. In November 2021, Pollard launched nail polish line called HBIC Ink. In 2022, Pollard began hosting Hot Haus, a reality competition which garnered notoriety for featuring OnlyFans creators competing to be named the next queer sex symbol on OutTV. In April 2022, Pollard shot a pictorial for Interview magazine and was also interviewed by editor-in-chief Mel Ottenberg. In July 2022, Flo Milli released her debut album You Still Here, Ho? from RCA Records, which features an introduction with Pollard, who shares that she's the "original HBIC" and adds that Flo Milli is the "princess of this rap shit." Pollard also appears on "Outro I Love New York". In promotional footage, "I Love New York" was flipped to "I Love Flo Milli", and Flo's album cover features an homage to I Love New York. Her "Ice Baby" video, recreated the season 2 finale of Flavor Of Love, and also features an appearance made by Deelishis, who reprises her role.

In 2023, Pollard became a lead on College Hill: Celebrity Edition. Later in 2023, she also starred in E!'s reality competition series House of Villains, a show featuring notorious and controversial personalities from reality television franchises competing to be crowned America's Ultimate Supervillain. In May 2023, Todrick Hall released an extended version of his hit "Y.A.S." featuring Pollard. The music video also includes Pollard and features a scene inspired by The Little Mermaid. In February 2024, she was interviewed in a televised interview on The Jason Lee Show, where the conversation's topics ranged from sexuality, to the impact of her career in an evolving entertainment industry. In July 2024, she was tapped to host the Baddies Midwest & Gone Wild Auditions on the Zeus Network. Later, in August 2024, she starred in an episode of Wiggin' Out with Tokyo Stylez, a reality series centered around celebrity hairstylist Tokyo Stylez, who was given just 24 hours to deliver a standout wig for Pollard.

In October 2024, Pollard was invited back to E!'s House of Villains for a second season. In January 2025, she was a contestant on a special season of the cooking competition series Worst Cooks In America: Celebrity Edition which is titled Heroes vs. Villains. The series pits celebrities, divided into two teams—'Heroes' and 'Villains'—against each other as they try to improve their cooking abilities. She also became the face of MAC Cosmetics Nude Lipstick campaign, where she posed nearly nude, with her body strategically covered by "I only wear MAC". In an interview with Essence magazine, Pollard shared her thoughts on the power of nude shades, saying, "When you're nude, you can't hide." In April 2025, Pollard made a return to U.K. television which marked a shift from former contestant to commentary role on 6 episodes of Celebrity Big Brother: Late and Live. In December 2025, she announced The HBIC Tour where she will be DJing at different venues.

She participated as a celebrity house guest in the 2026 British TV series of Big Brother.

== Personal life ==
Pollard's personal life has been heavily documented in the media. The early years of her fame were particularly filled with intense media scrutiny. She was briefly engaged to the I Love New York season 1 winner Patrick "Tango" Hunter. She was also engaged to George "Tailor Made" Weisgerber, the winner of I Love New York 2. They later separated in 2008.

In an episode of Brunch with Tiffany, Pollard said that she has been diagnosed with bipolar disorder. During the filming of Family Therapy with Dr. Jenn, Pollard announced that she was expecting her first child. She later experienced a miscarriage after the show.

On November 23, 2020, Pollard announced her third engagement, later revealed to be to a man named Jimmy Stewart, during I Love New York: Reunited.

On March 27, 2023, Pollard advocated for queer people in a TikTok video on OutTV's page. She ended the video by identifying as queer herself. In a 2024 interview with Jason Lee on The Jason Lee Show, Pollard elaborated stating, "I have lived a very, very broad life. I've never been afraid to do anything that I wanted to do." In September 2025, Pollard commented on the fluidity of gender expression. In an interview with PinkNews, Pollard stated, "I really do resonate with non-binary" and observed that "we are so dual without even recognising it". In an interview with Ziwe in March 2026, Pollard said, "My gender would be non-binary, meaning I'm very flexible in feminine and masculine energy" and that her pronouns are he, she and they.

== Legacy ==
Tiffany Pollard is celebrated in media and internet culture. She has been referred to as The Queen of Reality TV, as well as the Queen of Reaction Memes due to the number of gifs and memes featuring her, which are shared across social media and frequently go viral. The clips are sometimes remixed, contributing to their continued popularity. A well known example is Pollard asking "Do you know you have 30 minutes?".

In 2018, the cultural THNK 1994 Museum in Brooklyn dedicated an exhibit to Pollard. The opening gala was attended by Pollard which celebrated her contributions to the cultural landscape. She was honored with the Hall of Fame Award at the ARTAS in November 2022. In September 2025, Zara Larsson released her fifth album Midnight Sun. Track "Hot & Sexy" samples Pollard's monologue from Celebrity Big Brother reunion — Pollard re-recorded her lines for the song.

== Filmography ==
Film credits
Year	Title	Role	Notes
2005	Screech of the Decapitated	Macuzita dancer	
2008	First Sunday	Omunique's client	
2014	The Shop	Kiana	
2017	Sharknado 5: Global Swarming	Vega	

Television credits as self
Year	Title	Role	Notes
2006	Flavor of Love season 1	Herself; contestant	Runner-up, 11 episodes
2006	Flavor of Love season 2	Herself; contestant	Runner-up, 6 episodes
2006	VH1 in the Big 06' Awards	Herself; audience member	Television special
2007	I Love New York season 1	Herself; bachelorette	12 episodes
2007	Jimmy Kimmel Live!	Herself; guest	1 episode ("January, 9, 2007")
2007	The Tyra Banks Show	Herself; guest	1 episode ("February, 7, 2007")
2007	Maury	Herself; guest	1 episode ("February, 21, 2007")
2007	Say What? Karaoke	Herself; contestant	1 episode
2007	Flavor of Love Girls: Charm School	Herself; guest	1 episode
2007	Real Time with Bill Maher	Herself; guest	1 episode ("August, 31, 2007")
2007	Chelsea Lately	Herself; guest	1 episode ("September, 28, 2007")
2007	I Love New York season 2	Herself; bachelorette	13 episodes
2007	What Perez Sez	Herself; guest	1 episode ("December, 13, 2007")
2008	VH1: All Access	Herself; guest	1 episode ("June, 2, 2008")
2008	New York Goes to Hollywood	Herself; cast member	10 episodes
2008	Up Close with Carrie Keagan	Herself; guest	1 episode ("September, 8, 2008")
2009	New York Goes to Work	Herself; cast member	9 episodes
2010	20/20	Herself; guest	1 episode ("March, 15, 2010")
2011	Reality Obsessed	Herself; guest	1 episode
2011	Baggage	Herself; contestant	1 episode ("Season 3, Episode 71")
2012	Life After	Herself; guest	1 episode ("November, 26, 2012")
2013	That Sex Show	Herself; guest	1 episode
2014	E! True Hollywood Story	Herself; feature	1 episode, documentary
2015	Botched	Herself; botched	1 episode ("Season 2, Episode 1")
2015	Good Work	Herself; guest	1 episode ("April, 14, 2015")
2015	Candidly Nicole	Herself; guest	1 episode ("September, 16, 2015")
2015	Steve Harvey	Herself; guest	1 episode
2016	Celebrity Big Brother UK series 17	Herself; housemate	4th place, 36 episodes
2016	The Saturday Show	Herself; guest	1 episode ("February, 6, 2016")
2016	This Morning	Herself; guest	1 episode ("February, 8, 2016")
2016	The Next : 15	Herself; cast member	10 episodes
2016	Family Therapy with Dr. Jenn	Herself; cast member	10 episodes
2016	Up Late with Rylan	Herself; guest	1 episode ("June, 6, 2016")
2016	Flashback Tonight	Herself; guest	1 episode ("August, 2, 2016")
2016	The Doctors	Herself; guest	1 episode ("November, 14, 2016")
2016	Big Brother's: Bit on the Side	Herself; guest	1 episode
2016	Steve Harvey	Herself; guest	1 episode
2017	Famously Single	Herself; cast member	8 episodes
2017	Scared Famous	Herself; cast member	6 episodes
2017-2020	Brunch with Tiffany	Herself; host	20 episodes
2018	The Ex	Herself; host	Unaired
2018	Hip Hop Squares	Herself; contestant	1 episode
2018	Bossip	Herself; guest	1 episode
2018	Braxton Family Values	Herself; guest	1 episode
2019	RuPaul's Drag Race season 11	Herself; judge	3 episodes
2019	RuPaul's Drag Race: Untucked!	Herself; guest	1 episode ("March, 21, 2019")
2019	Action Bronson Watches Ancient Aliens	Herself; guest	1 episode ("August, 7, 2019")
2019	PeopleTV	Herself; guest	1 episode ("October, 16, 2019")
2019	Botched	Herself; botched	1 episode ("Season 6, Episode 1")
2020	The Real	Herself; guest	1 episode ("February, 4, 2020")
2020	Celebrity Ex on the Beach UK series 1	Herself; cast member	5 episodes
2020	One Mo' Chance season 1	Herself; guest	1 episode
2020	RuPaul's Drag Race: Vegas Revue	Herself; cameo	1 episode ("August, 28, 2020")
2020	Celebrity Page	Herself; guest	1 episode ("November, 22, 2020")
2020	The Eric Andre Show	Herself; guest	1 episode ("November, 8, 2020")
2020	I Love New York Reunion Special	Herself; host	Television special
2020-2026	Entertainment Tonight	Herself; guest	5 episodes
2021	The TS Madison Experience	Herself; cast member	6 episodes
2021	For Real: The Story of Reality TV	Herself; feature	Documentary
2022	Hot Haus season 1	Herself; host	6 episodes
2023	Hot Haus season 2	Herself; host	7 episodes
2023	College Hill: Celebrity Edition season 2	Herself; cast member	8 episodes
2023	House of Villains season 1	Herself; contestant	9th place, 4 episodes
2023	Watch What Happens Live with Andy Cohen	Herself; guest	1 episode ("Season 20, Episode 172")
2024	House of Villains season 2	Herself; contestant	4th place, 11 episodes
2024	The Jason Lee Show	Herself; guest	1 episode
2024	Wiggin' Out with Tokyo Stylez	Herself; guest	1 episode ("Season 1, Episode 2")
2024	Baddies Midwest & Baddies Gone Wild Auditions	Herself; host	Television special
2025	Worst Cooks in America: Celebrity Edition	Herself; contestant	5th place, 6 episodes
2025	Celebrity Big Brother: Late & Live	Herself; panelist	7 episodes
2025	This Morning	Herself; guest	1 episode ("April, 15, 2025")
2025	Tamron Hall	Herself; guest	1 episode ("October, 31, 2025")
2025	Slayers: Wheel of Fate	Herself; host	7 episodes
2026	House of Villains season 3	Herself; contestant	4th place, 10 episodes
2026	Celebrity Weakest Link	Herself; contestant	1 episode ("September, 21, 2026")
2026	Big Brother UK series 23	Herself; celebrity houseguest	3 episodes
2026	Big Brother: The Group Chat	Herself; guest	1 episode ("November, 1, 2026")

Television credits as actress
Year	Title	Role	Notes
2007	Nip/Tuck	Tiffany Pollard	1 episode ("December, 4, 2007")
2012	DTLA	Reesie	2 episodes
2012	Shadow Love	Pastor Mann	1 episode

== Awards and nominations ==
Year	Award	Category	Recipient	Result
2006	Fox Reality Awards	Favorite Fight	Flavor of Love	Won
2006	Fox Reality Awards	Favorite Villain	Flavor of Love	Won
2007	Teen Choice Awards	Choice TV: Female Reality Star	I Love New York	Nominated
2007	Fox Reality Awards	Most Memorable Reality Performer	Flavor of Love, Flavor of Love 2, and I Love New York	Nominated
2020	12th Annual Shorty Awards	Video	Brunch with Tiffany	Nominated
2022	9th American Reality Television Awards	Hall of Fame Recipient	Herself	Won
