= House of Villains season 2 =

House of Villains
- Season 2
- Hosted by: Joel McHale
- No. of contestants: 11
- Winner: Safaree Samuels
- Runner-up: Wes Bergmann
- No. of episodes: 11

Release
- Original network: E!
- Original release: October 9 – December 19, 2024

Season chronology
- ← Previous; Season 1 Next → Season 3

The second season of the television reality program House of Villains premiered on E! on October 9, 2024, and concluded on December 19, 2024. Joel McHale returns as host and features a cast of reality television's most memorable and notorious villains. Contestants live in a house while competing in challenges for power and safety, voting to banish each other until the last villain remaining wins a $200,000 cash prize and the title of America's Ultimate Supervillain. Safaree Samuels won the second season, defeating Wes Bergmann and Jessie Godderz.

== Contestants ==
The cast of 10 reality show villains was announced on March 27, 2024.

Cast member	Original series	Finish
Safaree Samuels	Love & Hip Hop: Atlanta	Winner
Wes Bergmann	The Real World: Austin	Runner-Up
Jessie Godderz	Big Brother 10	3rd place
Larsa Pippen (Note: Larsa entered the house as an intruder after the first Banishment on Episode 3.)	The Real Housewives of Miami	4th/5th place
Tiffany "New York" Pollard	Flavor of Love 1 (Note: Pollard returned to the series, having previously competed on House of Villains 1.)	4th/5th place
Kandy Muse	RuPaul's Drag Race 13	6th place
Teresa Giudice	The Real Housewives of New Jersey	7th place
Victoria Larson	The Bachelor 25	8th place
Camilla Poindexter	Bad Girls Club: Las Vegas	9th place
Richard Hatch	Survivor: Borneo	10th place
Larissa Lima	90 Day Fiance 6	11th place

Notes

Monica Garcia narrated the season as the voice of EVA ("Evil Voice Audio 2.0"), giving announcements to the contestants regarding challenges and game events. Garcia, along with Janice Dickinson, Tori Spelling, along with former contestants Bobby Lytes and Jax Taylor, made guest appearances during the second season.

== Voting history ==
Color key:

Winner
Runner-Up
3rd Place
Supervillain of the Week
Hit List Nominee
Redemption Winner
Immune
Eliminated

	Episode								
	1/2	3/4	5/6	7/8	8/9	9/10	10/11	11	
Supervillain of the Week	Safaree	Camilla	Larsa	Kandy	(None)	Jessie	Jessie	—N/a	
Hit List Nominees	Kandy; Larissa; Victoria	Jessie (Note: Victoria found a hidden "Knock Blocker" power, allowing her to remove one of the Supervillain's nominees and replace them with one of her choosing. She removed Wes, and replaced him with Jessie.); Richard; Safaree; ~~Wes~~	Camilla; Teresa; Victoria	Larsa; Safaree; Victoria	(None)	Kandy; Tiffany	Larsa; Tiffany; Wes	—N/a	
Redemption Winner	Kandy	Jessie	Victoria	Safaree	(None)	—N/a	Wes	—N/a	
Safaree	Supervillain of the Week	Hit List	Camilla	Victoria	5th	Kandy	No Vote (Note: For this round there was no banishment vote. Instead, whichever two villains remained on The Hit List after losing the Redemption Challenge were automatically banished.)	Winner (Episode 11)	
Wes	Larissa	Richard	Camilla	Victoria	4th	Kandy	No Vote	Runner-up (Episode 11)	
Jessie	Larissa	Richard	Camilla	Victoria	3rd	Supervillain of the Week	Supervillain of the Week	Third place (Episode 11)	Safaree (Note: As Jessie received no votes to win, he broke the jury's tie to determine the winner.)
Larsa	Not in House	Richard	Supervillain of the Week	Hit List	6th	Kandy	Banished (Episode 11)	Safaree	
Tiffany	Larissa (Note: Tiffany earned immunity for the week after pulling the "FU lever" in the "Crimes Against Reality" challenge.)	Richard	Teresa (Note: During the episode 5 Battle Royale challenge, Tiffany opened a box with the option to either become a candidate to be voted as Supervillain of the Week, or to receive immunity from the Hit List and select a different candidate. She chose the Immunity.)	Larsa	2nd	Hit List	Banished (Episode 11)	Wes	
Kandy	Victoria	Richard	Teresa	Supervillain of the Week	1st	Hit List	Banished (Episode 10)	Safaree	
Teresa	Larissa	Richard	Hit List	Victoria	7th (Note: Following Victoria's Banishment, contestants were required to rank themselves from most to least villainous. Afterwards, it was revealed that as part of a surprise Double Banishment, the contestant ranked as least villainous, Teresa, would be Banished.)	Banished (Episode 9)		Safaree	
Victoria	Hit List	Richard	Camilla	Hit List	Banished (Episode 8)			Wes	
Camilla	Larissa	Supervillain of the Week	Hit List	Banished (Episode 6)				Safaree	
Richard	Victoria	Hit List	Banished (Episode 4)					Wes	
Larissa	Hit List	Banished (Episode 2)						Wes	
Banished	Larissa; 5 of 7 votes to Banish	Richard; 7 of 7 votes to Banish	Camilla; 4 of 6 votes to Banish	Victoria; 4 of 5 votes to Banish	Teresa; Ranked least villainous	Kandy; 3 of 3 votes to Banish	Larsa; Lost the Redemption Challenge	Jessie; 0 of 8 votes to Win	Wes; 4 of 9 votes to Win
Banished	Larissa; 5 of 7 votes to Banish	Richard; 7 of 7 votes to Banish	Camilla; 4 of 6 votes to Banish	Victoria; 4 of 5 votes to Banish	Teresa; Ranked least villainous	Kandy; 3 of 3 votes to Banish	Tiffany; Lost the Redemption Challenge	Safaree; 5 of 9 votes to Win	

== Episodes ==
No. overall	No. in season	Title	Original release date	U.S. viewers (millions)
11	1	"Crimes Against Reality (Television)"	October 9, 2024	0.24 (Note: Combined total viewers from simultaneous airings of the second season premiere on E! and Bravo. Viewers from simultaneous airings of the second season premiere on Syfy and USA Network are not included.)
Battle Royale Challenge (Crimes Against Reality): Played in two teams of five, each team member begins in one of five adjacent cells of their team's cell block. The team member in the first cell must complete a task to break into the second team member's cell. These two team members then break into the third team member's cell, with this process continuing until all five players break out of the fifth cell. Additionally, in each cell is a "FU lever." If any contestant pulls the lever, they receive immunity for the week, but their team is penalized for one minute. The first team to break out of all five cells wins the ability to elect the Supervillain of the Week from their team.
12	2	"The Hollywood Walk of Shame"	October 10, 2024	0.18
Redemption Challenge (Hollywood Walk of No Shame): Contestants have one hour to collect as many signatures for a petition as possible from passersby along the Hollywood Walk of Fame. The contestant who collects the most signatures wins
13	3	"Don't Disrupt the Pecking Order"	October 17, 2024	0.10
Battle Royale Challenge (Party Crashers): Contestants attend a party where each time the music stops playing, they must form groups of the size announced by host Joel McHale. Any contestants leftover after each group has been formed are eliminated from the challenge. The last contestant standing wins.
14	4	"High Voltage Villains"	October 24, 2024	0.13
Redemption Challenge (Body Snatchers): Being directed by another contestant of their choice, contestants must make their way to the center of an electric maze while blindfolded, collect an inflatable doll, then proceed to the exit. The contestant with the fastest time wins.
15	5	"Housewife v. Housewife"	October 31, 2024	0.10
Battle Royale Challenge: Host Joel McHale presents a box to the house and announces that two contestants will partake in an election to be voted as Supervillain of the Week. To determine these two contestants, the contestant who took the box opens it to reveal their outcome for the challenge, then passes the box to another contestant of their choice to open the next outcome, with this process continuing until two contestants are confirmed as candidates. Outcomes of boxes include being confirmed as one of the candidates, being eliminated from contention, immunity from the Hit List, or choosing another contestant to eliminate from contention. Afterwards, the two contestants confirmed as candidates have the afternoon to campaign to the remaining contestants before a vote is held to determine Supervillain of the Week.
16	6	"Welcome to NY, New Jersey!"	November 7, 2024	0.16
Redemption Challenge (Erase to Escape): Contestants must search for their names written or stickered on 85 surfaces around a high school and erase or remove them. The first contestant to finish wins.
17	7	"Blood Bath"	November 14, 2024	0.11
Battle Royale Challenge (Blood On Your Hands): Each round, one contestant opens a box to reveal two identical bags: one filled with "blood" and one filled with "plasma". They must assign one bag to themselves and one for their opponent. Their opponent then has the decision to keep or switch the bags before they are opened. The contestant who opens the bag of plasma progresses to the next round while the contestant with the blood is eliminated from the challenge. The contestant that wins the final round becomes Supervillain of the Week.
18	8	"Un-Funny Business"	November 21, 2024	0.15
Redemption Challenge (Cap It Off): Contestants are presented with various photos of moments from the season and attempt to come up with a humorous caption for each photo. The captions are then presented anonymously to the non-competing contestants, who vote for their most humorous caption, with each vote earning a point for the creator of the caption. The contestant who scores the most points wins.
19	9	"F Bombs Away"	December 5, 2024	0.13
Following Victoria's banishment, the remaining seven contestants had to rank themselves from most to least villainous. It was then revealed that as part of a Double Banishment twist, the contestant ranked as least villainous, Teresa, would also be banished.: Battle Royale Challenge (Zero ****s to Give): Contestants must use a slingshot to launch 25 bombs over a fence. Midway through the challenge, contestants are given the chance to distribute five additional bombs among other contestants to slow them down. The first contestant to successfully launch all their bombs wins.
20	10	"Why Are All These Villains Crying?"	December 12, 2024	0.12
During the Battle Royale Challenge, the eliminated contestants returned for the finale and it was revealed that the winner of the season would be determined by a jury vote. The winner of the Battle Royale Challenge would automatically make it to the finale, joined by the contestant they did not nominate on the Hit List. The three contestants on the Hit List then compete in the Redemption Challenge for the final spot in the finale, with the two losing contestants eliminated.: Battle Royale Challenge (Touch of Evil): Contestants attempt to maintain contact with a statue made of butter for as long as possible. Throughout the challenge, conditions such as balancing on one leg are added to make the challenge more difficult. The last contestant standing wins.
21	11	"Sad Excuse for a Villain"	December 19, 2024	0.21
Redemption Challenge (Arch Enemies): Contestants are presented with nine quotes said by other contestants about them during the season. They must arrange blocks with the faces of these contestants, in the order the quotes are presented, to build an arch between two pedestals. The first contestant to finish wins and claims the final spot in the finale.
