= Family Therapy with Dr. Jenn =

American reality television series

- Genre: Reality
- Starring: Dr. Jenn Mann; Dr. Christian Conte; Umeko Allen; Rachel Clark; Kami Storck
- Country of origin: United States
- Original language: English
- No. of seasons: 1
- No. of episodes: 10

Production
- Executive producers: Dr. Jenn Mann; John Irwin; Jill Holmes; Susan Levison; Damian Sullivan; Tim Eagan
- Running time: 60 minutes
- Production company: Irwin Entertainment

Original release
- Network: VH1
- Release: March 16 – May 18, 2016

Related
- Couples Therapy

Family Therapy with Dr. Jenn is an American reality television series starring psychotherapist Dr. Jenn Mann and her staff. The series premiered on March 16, 2016, on VH1. Family Therapy is a spin-off of Couples Therapy, that chronicles famous families as they receive relationship counseling.

== Cast ==
=== Main cast ===
- Dr. Jenn
- Dr. Christian Conte
- Umeko Allen
- Rachel Clark
- Kami Storck

=== Families ===
- April and Bam Margera
- Briana and Brittany DeJesus
- Dina and Michael Lohan
- Bobby, Jeremy, and Damon Dash
- Tiffany Pollard and Michelle "Sister" Patterson

== Episodes ==
No.	Title	Original release date	US viewers (millions)
1	"Family Therapy Begins"	March 16, 2016	0.62
2	"Deny Everything"	March 23, 2016	0.61
3	"I've Got the Power"	March 30, 2016	0.62
4	"I Am in Crisis!"	April 6, 2016	0.67
5	"Secrets"	April 13, 2016	0.58
6	"Body Language"	April 20, 2016	0.67
7	"Traumas From the Grave"	April 27, 2016	0.66
8	"Smash House"	May 4, 2016	0.54
9	"Money Problems"	May 11, 2016	0.45
10	"Last Days of Therapy"	May 18, 2016	0.62

== See also ==
- Couples Therapy
