= Jenn Mann =

American psychotherapist and media personality

Jenn Mann is an American licensed marriage and family therapist (LMFT), sports psychology consultant, author, and speaker. She has a Master’s Degree (M.A.) in Clinical Psychology, a Doctorate (Psy.D.) in Marriage and Family Therapy and is licensed as a Marriage, Family and Child Therapist (L.M.F.T.)

She is the daughter of Barry Mann and Cynthia Weil, a famous songwriting couple. She was divorced from Joshua Berman in 2013. Mann has twin daughters, Mendez and Quincy.

Mann has a private practice as a psychotherapist in Beverly Hills, California. She has appeared in media as "Dr. Jenn" but she is a masters-level clinician only and is often misrepresented. She has acted as a relationship counselor for the VH1 reality shows Couples Therapy and spin-off Family Therapy. Until SiriusXM dropped Oprah Radio on December 31, 2014, Mann hosted a nightly radio call-in show. The show moved to a new channel in 2015.
