= Chandra Davis =

American model

- Born: Chandra London Davis; January 2, 1978 (age 48); Detroit, Michigan, U.S
- Other names: Deelishis, London Charles
- Occupations: Reality television star, video vixen, model, singer
- Years active: 2006-present
- Television: Flavor of Love
- Spouse: Raymond Santana (m. 2020; div. 2025)

Chandra London Davis (born January 2, 1978), better known by the nickname Deelishis, is an American reality television star, video vixen, model and singer. She is best known for her appearance on the second season of the hit VH1 celebreality series, Flavor of Love. She also goes by the stage-name, London Charles.

== Television career ==
In 2006, Davis appeared as was the winner of the second season of the hit VH1 celebreality show, Flavor of Love, where she received the nickname "Deelishis". She infamously won the show over a returning Tiffany "New York" Pollard in the season finale, who was also the runner-up of the first season. She revealed during the reunion special, she was no longer dating Flavor Flav. In 2007, she appeared in the VH1 special; Where Are They Now: Reality Stars.

In 2009, Davis competed in the unaired, third season of the VH1 celebreality spin-off show, I Love Money. She was disqualified from the competition for starting a physical altercation with For The Love of Ray J season 1, contestant Leah "Cashmere" Minor. The show was cancelled due to the murder of Jasmine Fiore. She has since made several other television appearances including; The Wendy Williams Experience, Comedy Central Roast, Love & Hip Hop: Atlanta, Dish Nation and VH1 Couples Retreat.

== Music career ==
Davis music career began in the mid-2000s, she began appearing in music videos for various artists such as; Busta Rhymes, Paul Wall and as a lollipop girl in Lil Wayne's, Lollipop music video. She began appearing in magazines including; Black Men, Smooth and XXL magazine. She guest appeared as a model on BET's Hip-Hop vs America.

In 2007, Davis released her debut single Rumpshaker, accompanying the release with a music video. She planned to release an album titled; Love Deelishis, as of 2026, no album has been announced or released. That same year she released a second single titled, Groove with You. In 2009, she released a third single on Myspace titled, The Movement, which was a response to the election of the United States president, Barack Obama. In 2010, she released her fourth and final single titled, Set It Off.

== Personal life ==
Davis' niece, pre-medicine student Arielle Anderson, was murdered during the 2023 Michigan State University mass shooting. Davis married Raymond Santana in 2020, they divorced in 2025.

== Filmography ==
Film and television
Year	Title	Role	Notes
2006	Flavor of Love season 2	Self; contestant	Winner, 12 episodes
2006	BET Hip-Hop Awards	Self; model	TV special
2006	The Wendy Williams Experience	Self; cameo	1 episode
2006	VH1 Big in 06 Awards	Self; audience member	TV special
2006	106 & Park	Self; special guest	2 episodes
2007	Dance Party	Self; host	
2007	Comedy Central Roast	Self; roaster	1 episode
2007	Where Are They Now? Reality Stars	Self; feature	TV special
2008	Hip Hop vs. American II: Where Did The Love Go?	Deelishis	TV film
2009	I Love Money season 3	Self; contestant	Disqualified, season unaired
2011	Queen of Media	Baby Momma	
2012	Pawn Shop	Danielle	
2014	Kony Montana	Deelishis	
2016	Mafietta: Rise of a Female Boss	Clarke Williams	Short film
2016-2018	Love & Hip Hop Atlanta	Self; guest	2 episodes
2019	Dish Nation	Self; guest co-host	1 episode
2021	VH1 Couples Retreat	Self; cast member	10 episodes
2022	Mafietta: The Introduction	Clarke Williams	
2022	CheMinistry	Self; interviewee	1 episode
2023	The Hollywood Groupchat	Self; interviewee	Web series, 1 episode
2023	Tagged: The Movie	Robin	
2023	A Taste of Betrayal	Candace	
2024	Cons & Cougars	Jackie	

Music videos
Year	Title	Artist	Role
2006	Touch It (Remix)	Busta Rhymes featuring Mary J. Blige, Rah Digga, Missy Elliott, Lloyd Banks, Papoose & DMX	Dancer
2007	Break Em Off	Paul Wall featuring Lil KeKe	Dancer
2008	Lollipop	Lil Wayne featuring Static	Lollipop girl
2016	On My Way	Young Dolph	Model

== Discography ==
Singles
Year	Title	Notes
2007	Rumpshaker	Debut single
2007	Groove With You	
2009	The Movement	
2010	Set It Off	
