= I Love New York season 1 =

I Love New York
- Season 1
- The cast of I Love New York
- Starring: Tiffany Pollard; Mauricio Sanchez; Michelle Patterson
- No. of episodes: 12

Release
- Original network: VH1
- Original release: January 8 – April 15, 2007

Season chronology
- Next → Season 2

I Love New York (season 1) is first season of the VH1 reality television series entitled I Love New York. The first season consisted of 12 episodes, which first aired weekly from January 8, 2007 to April 15, 2007.

== Production ==
In July 2006, VH1 published a casting call looking for contestants for their new series tentatively titled The Flavorette. Various blogs speculated that the star of this program could be Flavor of Love season one contestants "Rain" (Thela Brown), "Hoopz" (Nicole Alexander) or Pollard. Before the second season finale of Flavor of Love, Pollard denied having her own show but when the Flavor of Love season 2 finale aired, she confirmed she was the "Flavorette" and that she was already down to the final three contestants.

On November 3, 2006, VH1 announced the show's official title: I Love New York. The first commercial for the series aired on December 3, 2006 during the VH1 2006 Big Awards show. The show premiered on Monday, January 8, 2007 and is the most watched series debut in VH1 history.

== Contestants ==
Contestant Nickname	Real name	Hometown	Eliminated
Tango	Patrick Hunter	Tampa, Florida	Winner
Chance	Kamal Givens	Los Angeles, California	Runner-Up
Real†	Ahmad Givens	Oakland, California	Episode 9
Whiteboy	Joshua Gallander	Miami, Florida	Episode 8
12 Pack	David Amerman	Wyckoff, New Jersey	Episode 7
Mr. Boston	Lee Marks	Boston, Massachusetts	Episode 6
Rico	Sandro Padrone	Havana, Cuba	Episode 5
Heat	Jason Rosell	Queens, New York	Episode 4
Onyx	William Lash	Washington, D.C.	Episode 4
Bonez	Kevin Peters	Sacramento, California	Episode 3
Pootie	Lamonty Council	Chicago, Illinois	Episode 3 (Quit)^{[q]}
T-Weed	Kevin Watson	Chicago, Illinois	Episode 3
Romance	Ricky Perillo	Los Angeles, California	Episode 2
Token	Chase Irwin	Brentwood, Tennessee	Episode 2
Trendz	Hashim Smith	Brooklyn, New York	Episode 2
T-Bone	Tyrone Ellis	Dallas, Texas	Episode 1
Wood	Randy Richwood	East Orange, New Jersey	Episode 1
Jersey	Bryant Covert	Hoboken, New Jersey	Episode 1
Ace	Darin Darnell	Austin, Texas	Episode 1
T-Money	Thomas Young	New Orleans, Louisiana	Episode 1

^{^[q]} Left in episode 3 due to mental distress.

== Elimination order ==
New York's Call-out Order
#	Naming	Episodes									
#	Naming	1	2	3	4	5	6	7	8	9	11
1	Rico	Whiteboy	Whiteboy^{1}	Tango	Chance	Real	12 Pack	Chance^{2}	Chance	Chance^{1}	Tango
2	Pootie	Tango	Real	Real	12 Pack^{2}	12 Pack	Real	Whiteboy	Real	Tango ^{1}	Chance
3	Tango	Onyx	T-Weed	Rico	Real^{2}	Whiteboy^{2}	Whiteboy	Real	Tango	Real^{1}	
4	Wood	Real	Rico	Onyx	Whiteboy	Chance	Tango	Tango	Whiteboy		
5	Whiteboy	Heat	Mr. Boston	12 Pack	Tango	Mr. Boston	Chance	12 Pack			
6	12 Pack	Bonez	Tango	Chance	Rico	Tango	Mr. Boston^{2}				
7	Heat	Trendz	Heat	Whiteboy	Mr. Boston	Rico					
8	T-Bone	12 Pack	Pootie	Mr. Boston	Heat^{2}						
9	Jersey	Pootie	Bonez	Heat	Onyx						
10	Mr. Boston	Token	Chance	Bonez							
11	Onyx	T-Weed	Onyx^{1}	T-Weed^{2}							
12	T-Weed	Romance	12 Pack^{1}	Pootie							
13	Ace	Rico	Trendz								
14	Trendz	Mr. Boston	Token								
15	Bonez	Chance	Romance								
16	T-Money	Jersey									
17	Real	Wood									
18	Chance	T-Bone									
19	Token	Ace									
20	Romance	T-Money									

Episode 10 was a clip show
Episode 8 New York eliminated Whiteboy, no chains were handed out and the remaining contestants' names are listed in alphabetical order.

The contestant won the competition.
The contestant voluntarily withdrew from the competition.
The contestant was eliminated.

The following numbers indicate which type of date the contestant won:

- ^{1} The contestant won a group date with New York. On Episode 9, New York has a date with Tango, and another with Real and Chance. Their parents joined their sons on dates.
- ^{2} The contestant won a solo date with New York.

== Episodes ==
=== Season 1 (2007) ===
No. overall	No. in season	Title	Original release date
1	1	"Do You Have Love for New York?"	January 7, 2007
After getting her heart broken twice by Flavor Flav, New York invites 20 suitors to live in her mansion in a quest to find true love.
2	2	"The Mangeant"	January 15, 2007
The guys compete in a beauty pageant, New York suspects Trendz is only on the show to promote his music, and Romance accuses 12 Pack of two-timing.
3	3	"Big Ballers"	January 22, 2007
Whiteboy gets some tragic news about a friend back home, New York evaluates the guys' earning potential, and Pootie's behavior alarms the house.
4	4	"What's Up Dog?"	January 29, 2007
The guys break into teams to design and build dog houses, New York questions Heat's priorities, and everybody heads to church.
5	5	"Who's Got Game?"	February 12, 2007
Boston tries getting into shape with 12 Pack's help, WNBA star Tamara Moore tests the guys on the court, and conflict erupts as the suitors vie for alone time with New York.
6	6	"Momma Said Knock You Out"	February 19, 2007
The guys show their parenting skills by looking after a group of girls, Sister Patterson tasks the guys with making dinner, and a boxing challenge gets personal between Chance and Boston.
7	7	"Guess Who's Coming to Dinner"	March 5, 2007
New York gets the 411 on her five remaining suitors by spending a day with their exes, and the guys feel the heat when old flames show up to dinner.
8	8	"Gettin' Hot in the Desert"	March 12, 2007
Tango and Real spar at a two-on-one dinner with New York, and White Boy and Chance must rise to the challenge of sharing a hot-air balloon date.
9	9	"Momma's Boys"	March 19, 2007
New York is wowed by Chance's showmanship at the horse farm, Tango and his mom try to impress during dance class, and Sister Patterson has a proposal for Chance.
10	10	"How She Took a Chance and Learned to Tango"	March 26, 2007
New York looks back at key moments from the show with never-before-seen footage of 12 Pack's lap-dance fiasco, Chance's feud with Boston, Pootie's out-of-pocket behavior and more.
11	11	"The Final Adios"	April 27, 2007
New York heads to Mexico to spend quality time with her two remaining suitors before making a final decision.
12	12	"Reunion"	April 15, 2007
New York joins host La La Anthony to catch up with her most memorable suitors, hear the truth from Sister Patterson and reunite with her fiance Tango.

== DVD release ==
The complete first season DVD was released October 2, 2007 for publicity for the second season. It contains all eleven episodes including the reunion special. An Australian DVD was released on November 1, 2008.
