= New York Goes to Hollywood =

- Created by: Cris Abrego; Mark Cronin
- Starring: Tiffany Pollard; Lizza Monet-Morales
- Opening theme: "The World Should Revolve Around Me"
- Composer: Little Jackie
- Country of origin: United States
- No. of episodes: 8

Production
- Executive producers: Cris Abrego; Mark Cronin; Ben Samek

Original release
- Network: VH1
- Release: August 4 – September 22, 2008

Related
- I Love New York; New York Goes to Work

New York Goes to Hollywood is a VH1 reality television series that premiered on August 4, 2008. It is a spin-off of the I Love New York series, featuring Tiffany "New York" Pollard as she tries to find an acting job in Hollywood, California. In order to be an "established actress," Tiffany Pollard has to put her life aside to achieve her Hollywood goal by leaving her mother, Michelle Patterson, and George "Tailor Made" Weisgerber, whose proposal she refused. A follow-up/spin-off season, entitled New York Goes to Work, premiered May 4, 2009.

== Cast ==
All cast members played themselves unless otherwise listed.

=== Stars ===
- Lizza Monet Morales
- Tiffany "New York" Pollard
- Scott Sedita

=== Recurring cast members ===
- Amyrh Harris
- Amy Kelly
- Dane Nielsen
- Akihiro Kitamura
- Kazu Nagahama
- Michelle Rothschild-Patterson
- George Weisgerber — "Tailor Made"

=== One-time appearances ===
- Mark Cronin
- Cris Abrego
- Addison Witt
- Zondra Wilson
- Barry Jay
- Zachary Christopher Fay
- Dina Davis

== Crew ==
- Dave Miller — director
- Cris Abrego — co-creator
- Mark Cronin — co-creator

== Episodes ==
=== Season 1 (2008) ===
| No. overall | No. in season | Title | Original release date |
|---|---|---|---|
| 1 | 1 | "California Here I Come!" | August 4, 2008 |
New York places an ad for an assistant and tries to find a workout instructor.
| 2 | 2 | "Actress vs. Celebrity" | August 11, 2008 |
A prospective manager sends New York on a series of auditions where she faces criticism.
| 3 | 3 | "Japanese Commercial Shoot" | August 18, 2008 |
New York and her assistant do a little research into their idea of Japanese culture.
| 4 | 4 | "At Home With New York" | August 25, 2008 |
New York is ready to tackle her next big goal to become a serious respectable A-List actress.
| 5 | 5 | "And She Sings??" | September 1, 2008 |
New York takes lessons with a vocal coach; the assistant calls in sick.
| 6 | 6 | "Talk Show Appearance" | September 8, 2008 |
New York tries to salvage an old relationship; romance threatens to cloud priorities.
| 7 | 7 | "Romeo and Juliet... and Tailor Made" | September 15, 2008 |
New York must deliver a solid performance in the Romeo and Juliet showcase.
| 8 | 8 | "I Love New York 3?" | September 22, 2008 |
New York's past continues to hinder Tiffany's acting career. Choosing between an offer to do I Love New York 3 or New York Goes to Hollywood: Part 2.

== Critical reception ==
In a negative review of the show, Common Sense Media's Kari Croop criticized what she felt was an "awkwardly scripted approach to 'reality,'" also calling New York's acting abilities "questionable."
