= I Love New York (TV series) =

- Created by: Cris Abrego; Mark Cronin
- Starring: Tiffany Pollard; Michelle Patterson; Mauricio "Chamo" Sanchez (season 1)
- Country of origin: United States
- No. of seasons: 2
- No. of episodes: 25

Production
- Executive producers: Cris Abrego; Mark Cronin; Ben Samek
- Running time: 60 minutes (including commercials)

Original release
- Network: VH1
- Release: January 8, 2007 – January 6, 2008

I Love New York is a reality television series featuring Tiffany "New York" Pollard on a quest to find her true love. The series first aired on VH1 as a spin off to Flavor of Love, another relationship competition series, which featured Pollard as a finalist in two consecutive seasons.

The winner of the show's first season, Tango (Patrick S. Hunter), failed to deliver as New York's soul mate. When the second season aired, Tailor Made (George Weisgerber) was revealed as New York's chosen flame. (Weisgerber and Pollard later separated during the taping of New York Goes to Hollywood.)

In addition to Pollard, a host of other individuals from Flavor of Love, including "Sister" Patterson (Pollard's mother), appeared on the show to help Pollard choose the right man. Mauricio Sanchez played New York's assistant, "Chamo," during the first season.

The production of a second season of I Love New York was first announced during a commercial break for the April 29, 2007, episode of Flavor of Love Girls: Charm School. After I Love New York was wrapped up for season one, the house was used for another VH1 show, Flavor of Love Girls: Charm School.

On October 22, 2020, a reunion special titled I Love New York: Reunited was announced which premiered on November 23, 2020.

| Season | Season premiere | Season finale | Reunion show | Winner | Runner-up | Number of contestants | Number of episodes |
|---|---|---|---|---|---|---|---|
| 1 | January 8, 2007 (4.426M viewers) | April 2, 2007 (4.8M viewers) | April 15, 2007 (5.01M viewers) | Patrick Hunter "Tango" | Kamal Givens "Chance" | 20 | 12 |
| 2 | October 8, 2007 | December 17, 2007 (5.4M viewers) | January 6, 2008 (4.86M viewers) | George Weisgerber "Tailor Made" | Ezra Masters "Buddha" | 20 | 13 |

== Spinoffs ==
=== I Love Money ===
A large number of contestants from Flavor of Love, Rock of Love with Bret Michaels, and I Love New York are brought together in a mansion in Mexico to compete in a co-ed battle of mental and physical challenges to win $250,000. I Love Money was filmed from February to March 2008, with the season premiere on July 6, 2008.

=== New York Goes to Hollywood ===
New York Goes to Hollywood began on August 4, 2008, and consisted of ten 30-minute episodes. The show starred New York as she went throughout Hollywood trying to find an acting job. To focus on her new mission, New York has to put her last conquest, Tailor Made, on the backburner as she tries to take on Tinseltown. At the end of the series, Pollard decided to keep auditioning for film work, stating she would continue to document her career search in "New York Goes to Hollywood: Part 2"; if her film career doesn't pan out, she has mentioned a possible return to reality-television dating with an "I Love New York 3."

=== Real Chance of Love ===
Brothers Ahmad (Real) and Kamal (Chance) Givens did not win I Love New York, but they were given a second chance in the spin-off Real Chance of Love, which premiered October 20, 2008. On the show, the horse-breeding, music-producing entertainer brothers (known as the Stallionaires) were the stars of their own reality dating competition. Seventeen female contestants participated in the show and taking part in various challenges. Each week, women are eliminated until the final episode, where Ahmad selected "Corn Fed" and Kamal selected no one. A second season has been confirmed by Vh1 and casting began in March 2009. The season premiered on August 3, 2009 and the finale was on October 26, 2009. On the second-season finale Ahmad selected "Doll" and Kamal selected "Hot Wingz".

=== New York Goes to Work ===
New York Goes to Work premiered on May 4, 2009. The reality show followed New York as she searched for a regular job. After the finale, viewers were asked to vote on what she should do next. The choices were: I Love New York 3, Take a vacation, or find a real job. America voted for I Love New York 3.

=== Frank the Entertainer in a Basement Affair ===
A casting call was issued for a VH1 reality dating show starring Frank Maresca (The Entertainer). The show was tentatively entitled The Entertainer of Love but it was revealed on the VH1 Blog that the show would be called Frank the Entertainer in a Basement Affair. The show premiered January 3, 2010.

== See also ==
- The Bachelorette (2003)
- A Shot at Love with Tila Tequila (2007)
- Transamerican Love Story (2008)
