= Samantha Cole (disambiguation) =

Samantha Cole may refer to:

- Sam Cole, also cited as Samantha Cole, technology journalist and co-founder of 404 Media
- Samantha Cole (born 1975), singer-songwriter
- Samantha Cole (album), a 1997 studio album by Samantha Cole
