= Flock Safety =

American video surveillance company

Flock Group Inc.

- A Flock camera on Osceola Parkway, Florida.
- Type: Private
- Industry: Technology; Surveillance
- Founded: 2017 (9 years ago)
- Founders: Garrett Langley; Matt Feury; Paige Todd
- Headquarters: 3284 Northside Parkway NW, Atlanta, Georgia, US
- Area served: United States
- Key people: Garrett Langley (CEO)
- Products: Automated license plate readers CCTV cameras Gunfire detection systems Software
- Revenue: $300 million
- Number of employees: 1,500 (2025)
- Website: flocksafety.com

Flock Group Inc., doing business as Flock Safety, is a privately held American manufacturer and operator of surveillance hardware and software, particularly automated license plate recognition (ALPR), mass video surveillance, gunfire locator systems, and software to integrate data gathered by these technologies. Founded in 2017, Flock operates such systems under contract with law enforcement agencies, neighborhood associations, and private property owners. As of July 2026, Flock says it operates in over 6,000 communities and performs over 20 billion vehicle scans in the US every month; the company has ALPRs in all 50 US states. Flock Safety's network consists of cameras, image recognition, and machine learning, which share data with police departments.

Flock markets their services to law enforcement, homeowner associations and similar community organizations as tools for crime prevention and investigations. Flock has been described by critics as an example of mass surveillance, and their efficacy and effects on privacy and other civil liberties are the subject of public scrutiny, debate, and litigation.

== Corporate history ==
Flock was founded in 2017. It was co-founded by three Georgia Tech alumni: Garrett Langley, Paige Todd, and Matt Feury. It began as a side project in which the three co-founders built their first video surveillance cameras by hand around Langley's dining room table. When a DeKalb County detective told Langley that his camera product had helped with solving a home break-in, Langley called the two other co-founders and told them to quit their jobs. They joined the Summer 2017 batch of Y Combinator.

By 2024, Flock's fixed cameras had been installed in over 4,000 cities across 42 states. By April of that year, Flock employed over 900 people.

In June 2024, a judge in the Norfolk, Virginia, Circuit Court ruled that collecting location data from the city's 172 Flock ALPRs constitutes a search under the Fourth Amendment and cannot be used as evidence in a criminal case when collected without a warrant. The ruling likened ALPR location databases to tracking devices, whose use by police was previously found unconstitutional without a warrant in United States v. Jones. Following this ruling, the company began to receive additional pushback from communities concerned about the legality of their operation. That October, Flock acquired Aerodome, a manufacturer of drones for law enforcement, and announced plans to introduce its own line of drones.

As of 2025, Flock is used by over 6,000 municipalities in the United States. The company had raised a total $950 million in venture funding, with a $7.5 billion valuation. Much of Flock's initial investment came from private venture capital funds associated with Peter Thiel, who has been criticized for his anti-democratic views and support for surveillance technologies. Some cities have stopped working with Flock over the use of its data in immigration enforcement and for community privacy concerns, while others have done so due to the company acting without the consent of the city.

In October 2025, Flock Safety announced a partnership with Amazon's Ring security products, where residents with Ring cameras would have the option to share video data to public safety agencies in legal investigations. The plan came under scrutiny after Amazon ran an ad during Super Bowl LX that depicted the Ring's "Search Party" function for finding missing or lost pets, enhanced with AI surveillance. A joint decision was made to cancel the planned integration.

In October 2026, Flock announced it had reduced its staff by 18%, or around 270 employees, following a voluntary buyout program.

== Products ==
=== Falcon and Sparrow ===
Typical pole-mounted Flock Safety ALPR cameras, each with a solar panel above the main unit

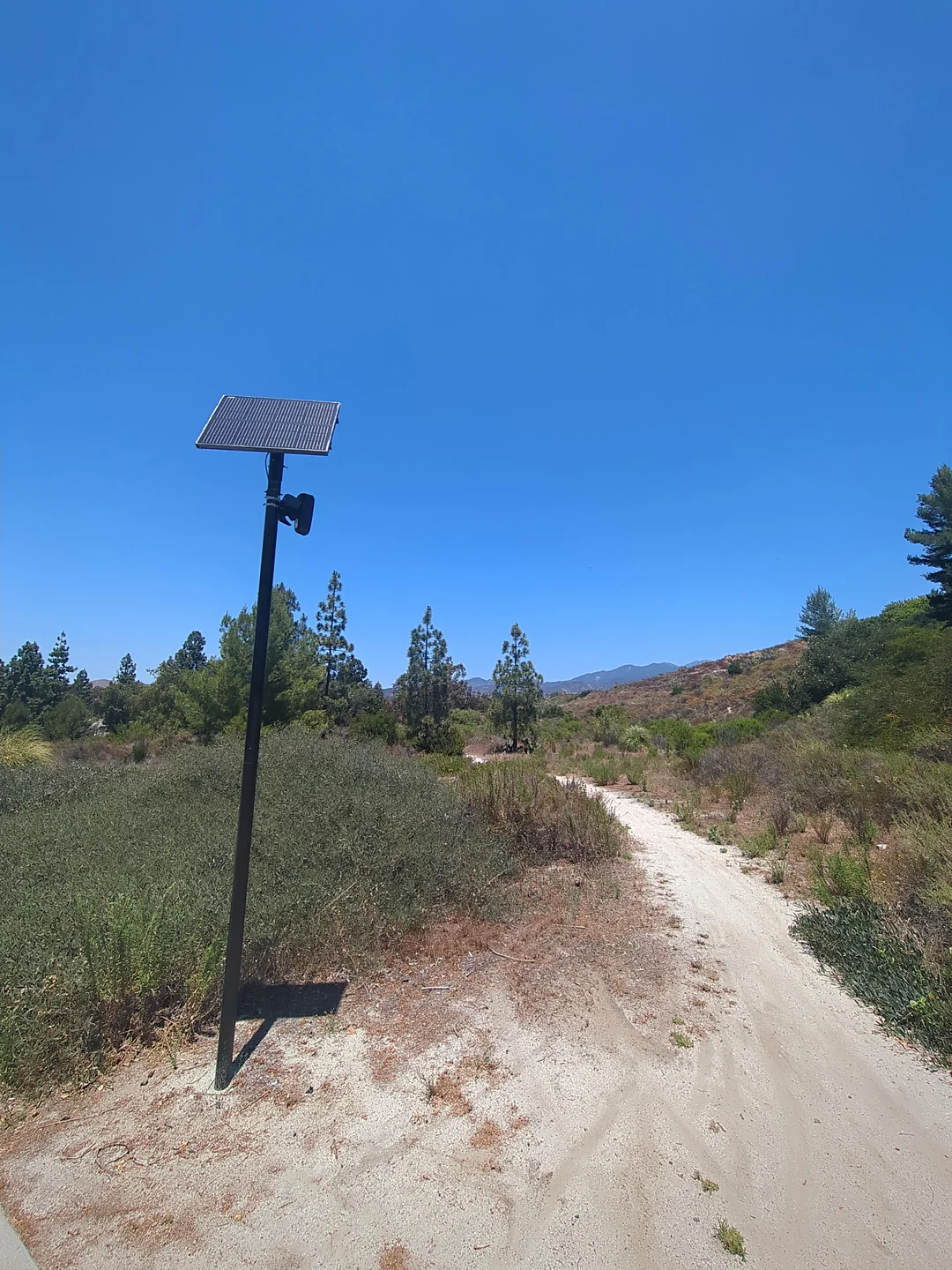
Flock camera located on a hiking trail

The Falcon and Sparrow are automatic license plate readers (ALPRs) that monitor traffic and photograph the rear of all passing vehicles. Their software uses computer vision to read the vehicles' license plates and identify other distinguishing visual characteristics, sending that information to a central server via an LTE cellular network. Flock's servers then log the identifying data, with the time and location of the scan, in a searchable database and compare all results with the National Crime Information Center, as well as state and local police watchlists of cars that are reported stolen or otherwise of interest to the police, instantly alerting nearby officers upon a match.

ALPRs like Flock's differ from traffic enforcement cameras in that they are intended for surveillance and criminal investigations and do not perform any autonomous enforcement of traffic laws, though data from Flock cameras has previously been used by police to issue a ticket. According to Jill Walker Rettberg, the cameras are designed to not be noticed in an urban environment. In July 2026, Flock cameras have reportedly been installed hidden inside the backs of speed readers to avoid vandalism.

Flock says that its system's ability to identify vehicles' visual features, which it calls "vehicle fingerprint technology", is unique among ALPR systems; they state that the system can identify vehicles' make, model, and color, as well as other distinguishing attributes such as mismatching colors, bumper stickers, dents, and temporary license plates, allowing investigators to search for recorded vehicles based on these characteristics. Flock states that its ALPRs can capture images of vehicles traveling at up to 100 miles per hour (160 km/h) at distances of up to 75 feet (23 m), regardless of lighting.

Flock says its ALPRs "focus on vehicles, not people", and are intended to help police identify vehicle details, not personal information. However, Flock additionally provides a tool called FreeForm, which allows police to search for anything in a scene with natural language. Public records requests show that police searched for individuals by their characteristics, including race, gender, clothing, height, tattoos, and perceived political affiliation.

Most Flock devices are powered by solar panels and rechargeable batteries, allowing them to operate in locations without access to utility power. Many are mounted on manufacturer-supplied poles, while others are affixed to existing lampposts or telephone poles. Flock also offers mobile trailers, which contain two pan–tilt–zoom (PTZ) cameras, one panoramic video camera, and deterrent devices such as flashing lights and a speaker.

Since 2019, numerous companies have begun offering similar ALPR products, including Axon Enterprise, Axis Communications, Genetec, Leonardo US, Motorola Solutions, Neology, Rekor, and Verkada.

Flock offers software which integrates its ALPR and vehicle identification software into existing video camera systems, including IP cameras and Axon dashcams widely used in police vehicles. Jill Walker Rettberg stated Flock's network can be integrated into predictive policing platforms like Palantir.

=== Condor ===
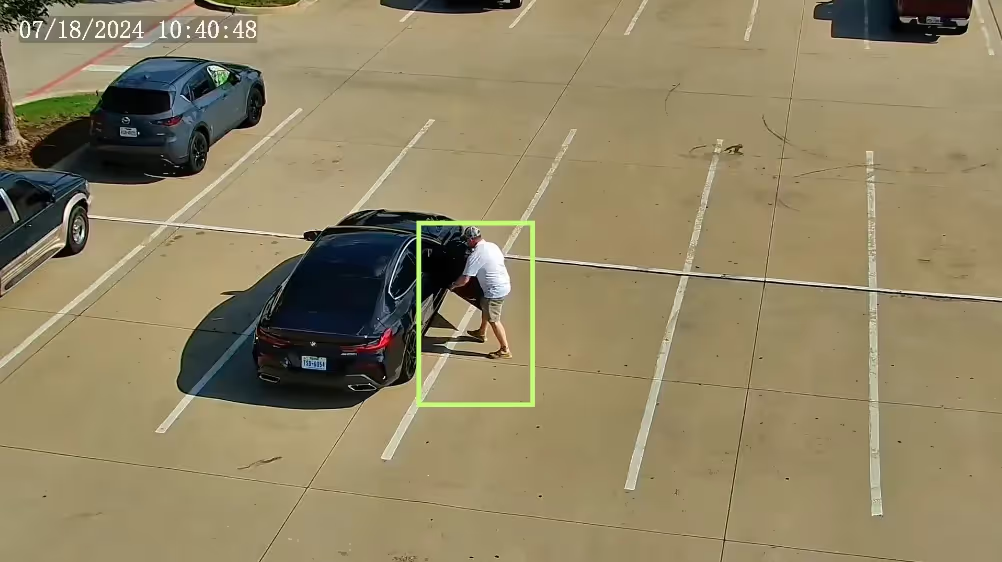
An individual being automatically tracked by a Flock PTZ camera

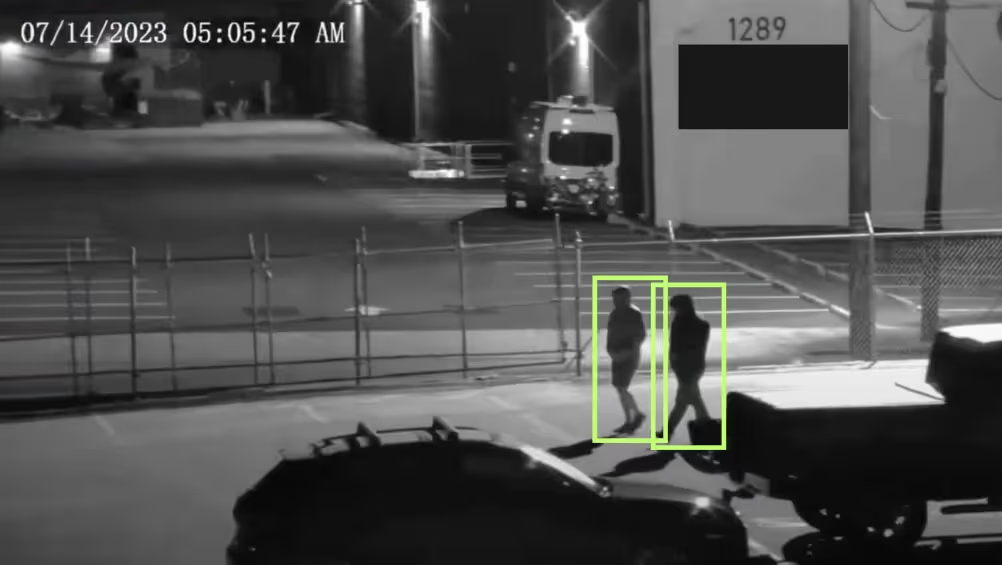
Multiple individuals being tracked by a PTZ camera

Flock's Condor cameras are PTZ surveillance cameras primarily marketed as a method to avoid blind spots from fixed-angle cameras while having more than just ALPR functionality, such as automatically tracking people. Condor cameras can automatically zoom in on cars, people, faces, phone screens, and other objects nearby. According to marketing material on Flock's website, they can also be controlled manually.

=== Nova ===
In May 2025, Flock was developing a new product called Nova that the company referred as a "public safety data platform", which would supplement ALPR data with information from data breaches, public records, and commercially available data in order to track specific individuals without a warrant. As of May 2025, Nova was already in use by law enforcement in an early access program. The Electronic Frontier Foundation described Flock Nova as a "dystopian panopticon". After 404 Media reporting, the company decided not to include information from data breaches in Nova.

=== Raven ===
Launched in 2021, the Flock Raven is an audio gunfire locator, similar in function to ShotSpotter. The Raven records audio in 5-second increments, using artificial intelligence to analyze the sound clips for audible gunfire. When a gunshot is detected, the device estimates its location and alerts police. Like the ALPRs, they can be mounted on manufacturer-supplied poles and powered by solar panels. The company has claimed that Flock Ravens detect gunshots with an accuracy of 90%, but data from the city of San Jose, California, in February 2023 revealed that Ravens only alerted correctly to gunfire 50% of the time, while 34% of its alerts were confirmed false negatives. In July 2023, these figures improved to 81% confirmed gunfire and 7% false negatives after Flock recalibrated their sensors.

In October 2025, Flock announced that their Raven devices would begin listening for "human distress", with advertisements showing police being alerted when the device picks up on screaming. In July 2026, after public backlash, Flock stated in a blog post that it would no longer be implementing the feature.

=== Alpha ===
Flock produces a drone marketed as a "Drone as First Responder" system. It has one hardware variant named "Alpha". Drones can be stored in remotely-located "docks", then deployed to a given location with a remote trigger, including manual direction to GPS coordinates, or automated deployment to the location of license plate reader or gunshot detection alerts. The drones have both regular, thermal, and night-vision cameras, and can fly up to 60 miles per hour (97 km/h). The drones are equipped with license plate reader technology and can see plates from up to 2,000 feet (610 m) away.

The drones are marketed as a reactive rather than proactive solution, and they are intended to only leave their dock when deployed by a human or automated alert. The drones have been criticized for mass surveillance risks and militarization, as well as for collecting a more expansive set of data than traditional fixed-location cameras. The Electronic Frontier Foundation stated the drones could "capture footage from areas typically inaccessible to a casual patrol officer" such as people's backyards, roofs, and through windows.

=== OS Investigate ===
In August 2026, Wired reported that limited prompts and code from an AI and text search-based Flock software tool called OS Investigate, previously known as Nightshift, had been leaked via publicly accessible Flock login pages. Wired stated other leaked code from Flock's website contained a list of tools available to OS Investigate, including the ability to correlate Flock-native data such as license plate scans and camera metadata, police department data such as arrest records and dispatch logs, and commercial databases including private personal data such as Social Security numbers and birth dates, as well as emails, phone numbers, and relatives or associated individuals.

Wired stated that the leaked prompts commonly involved searches based on area, time, or behavior, rather than searching based on an individual by license plate, including behavior such as someone visiting three or more retail locations within 3 days, or someone driving their car within a neighborhood in a given time frame. It also included the capability to do a "workup", which Flock describes as a "one-command background check" that can list a subject's name, date of birth, owned vehicles, and police records, as well as personal contact details, relatives, and online accounts.

Flock's CEO Garett Langley stated that Investigate OS was like a crime analyst that was "always awake, always watching out for you" and stated that investigators who try it get "addicted". Flock stated the product is currently being tested with a "small group of law enforcement partners", and that it is still being developed.

== Business model ==
Flock owns and operates all of its devices, leasing them to various categories of customers. Competitors primarily market their products to law enforcement agencies, but Flock also markets its products to community organizations and private entities. Some customers share data from their systems with police agencies.

Marketing materials center on efforts to reduce crime, and the company uses bird-themed product names. Until 2026, the sales team conducted surveillance demos in Georgia using a real youth gymnastics center, playgrounds, schools, and a pool.

Flock has developed relationships with several mayors. After the Denver city council voted to end the city's relationship with the company, the mayor negotiated a free six-month extension of the contract, for which no approval was required.

== Political activity ==
Flock has lobbied and donated to Democratic and Republican party politicians. From 2022 to 2024, the company donated $20,000 to the Democratic Mayors Association and $10,000 to the Republican-aligned Community Leaders of America. Flock began federal lobbying in 2024, spending $840,000 in 2025 federal lobbying and $430,000 from January to July 2026. From 2025 to July 2026, Flock spent $1 million on state-level lobbying in 34 states.

In October 2026, Bernie Sanders, Alexandria Ocasio-Cortez, and Jeff Merkley introduced the Ban Flock Act, which, while named after the company, would not explicitly ban Flock or its products. The act would prohibit federal agencies from using ALPRs, would block federal funding for any states or local governments utilizing ALPRs, and would grant a private right of action to individuals who experienced rights violations due to federal ALPR use. Locally funded ALPR programs would not be affected.

== Efficacy and accuracy ==
Some law enforcement agencies have said that the technology is "helpful at generating investigative leads and solving crimes that may have otherwise gone unsolved", with some additionally claiming a deterrent effect.

In 2024, Cyrus Farivar, writing for Forbes, questioned a statistic crediting Flock Safety's technology with an 80% reduction in residential burglaries in San Marino, California, in early 2021 compared to the same period in 2020. Farivar asserted that burglaries actually slightly increased, and that serious crimes remained nearly unchanged. Farivar also questioned similar claims from Flock regarding Fort Worth, Dayton, and Lexington.

A 2021 study of Flock's Falcon camera by "surveillance research firm IPVM ... found a 10% error rate in the camera output". Flock then halted sales to IPVM and disputed the accuracy of IPVM's findings. Inaccuracies in Flock's cameras have resulted in wrongful arrests in several cities.

In 2026, Business Insider reported that a driver in Roseville, California, had been repeatedly stopped by police due to Flock misidentifying a character on his license plate. An analysis by the local police department stated that 71% of the 1,427 stolen or used-in-felony vehicle alerts sent to them by Flock in 2023 and 2024 were incorrectly identified plates, and Flock had also repeatedly not identified passing vehicles that were used in crimes. Flock stated that Roseville had a "particularly unique deployment" of cameras that were set up to only capture the rear of passing vehicles to avoid capturing people's faces, and that they were using older hardware and cameras placed higher up than Flock usually recommends. Flock refused to comment on whether it independently tests its cameras' accuracy.

== Cybersecurity vulnerabilities ==
In 2025, a series of vulnerabilities in Flock cameras was identified, including hardcoded credentials and connection details, cleartext storage of code, and an enabled debug interface. Flock stated these vulnerabilities would require physical access to the device to exploit. Later in 2025, a separate cybersecurity flaw was found by researchers, which allowed anyone to access live camera feeds and other data from the Flock Condor line through publicly exposed live streams and administrator control panels. Flock stated the issue involved a limited number of devices caused by a misconfiguration and said it had been remedied. In November 2025, a security researcher discovered that Flock server logs were publicly available without a login; the vulnerability was patched in December 2025.

== Removal and damage to Flock devices ==
Widespread backlash against Flock has led to Flock devices being obstructed, destroyed, or stolen by a wide variety of means, including being blocked with tall signs, dismantled and taken, having their poles cut down or unscrewed, being set on fire, shot, slashed, painted over, beaten with a hammer, and rammed into with a truck. Many online creators have additionally claimed green lasers can damage the cameras, though only high-power lasers less frequently available online are capable of doing so. Flock cameras have been vandalized in at least 36 states according to NPR.

Police have previously attempted to catch individuals vandalizing Flock cameras, using methods such as staking out 3D-printed decoy cameras to catch a man trying to cut the camera down, using nearby surveillance cameras, or using Flock to track suspects' license plates.

Not all cases of vandalism have resulted in meaningful charges or sentencing. A man who was allegedly caught on camera destroying Flock cameras had all charges dropped without prejudice by an Ohio grand jury, and a man who destroyed a decoy camera had his charges reduced after they were adjusted to match the value of the 3D-printed camera, rather than a potential real Flock camera. Individuals who vandalized Flock cameras have received both monetary and public support.

In response to frequent vandalism and a negative public perception of Flock, cities and towns have begun canceling contracts with Flock and installing Axon cameras instead, with at least 214 cities and counties ending their relationships with Flock, and 90 of them ending their relationships within a single month, though Flock has stated they added seven times more customers than they lost in 2026, and later stated new partnerships with cities outpaced non-renewals by 10 to 1. Organizations such as the American Civil Liberties Union have stated that solely replacing the brand of ALPRs used does not guarantee a higher level of civil liberties protections, and other advocates have claimed the information collected is too large regardless of the brand providing the ALPRs.

== Controversies ==
Flock's products have generated bipartisan controversy and backlash across the political spectrum. Flock cameras have been stolen, vandalized, and purposefully obstructed.

In October 2024, Colorado activist Will Freeman created a crowdsourced searchable online map of the United States showing locations of Flock cameras called DeFlock. In January 2025, Flock sent a cease and desist letter to the project.

On their website, DeFlock lists dozens of jurisdictions that have ended contracts with Flock or deactivated their cameras. When the Los Angeles Police Department (LAPD) announced it would not renew its contract with Flock Safety, set to expire in June 2026, the department explicitly cited civil liberties and privacy concerns and public backlash. The LAPD's chief information officer stated they wanted more contractual terms and protections, and that a new contract was being drafted. Flock said they believed the LAPD's decision was based on "misconceptions" and hoped to resume service soon.

=== Privacy concerns ===
Privacy concerns have been raised with respect to ALPRs generally, including Flock's systems. Additionally, Flock's surveillance model has spurred debate. Flock's surveillance technology has been criticized for its broadening of public surveillance and effect on civil liberties, as described by privacy experts and organizations like the Electronic Frontier Foundation (EFF) and the American Civil Liberties Union (ACLU). The EFF argues that ALPRs create more problems than they solve.

In March 2022, the ACLU released a report criticizing Flock Safety's business model and products. In 2023, the ACLU acknowledged some uses of ALPRs could be acceptable, but emphasized the need for careful controls:

There's no reason the technology should be used to create comprehensive records of everybody's comings and goings—and that is precisely what ALPR databases like Flock's are doing. In our country, the government should not be tracking us unless it has individualized suspicion that we're engaged in wrongdoing.

In an interview, CEO Garrett Langley said he believed there were two types of activists raising concerns about Flock, praising the ACLU and EFF for their methods and approaches but comparing the DeFlock project to terrorists and Antifa. He later apologized for these comments and called them a mistake.

In October 2024, the Institute for Justice filed a federal lawsuit against the Norfolk Police Department on behalf of two local residents, asserting that the department's use of Flock ALPRs constituted illegal surveillance in violation of the Fourth Amendment. In California, state law prohibits sharing license plate reader data with federal agencies, but in 2025 it was reported that several state and municipal law enforcement agencies nonetheless did so.

In December 2025, 404 Media reported that Flock had left at least 60 of its Condor cameras "around the country exposed to the open internet, where anyone could watch them, download 30 days worth of video archive, and change settings, see log files, and run diagnostics".

In April 2026, 404 Media reported that Flock Safety representatives had conducted product demos using video from a Jewish Community Center in Dunwoody, Georgia, that included feeds of a children's gymnastics room, a playground, a school, and a pool. In response, Flock CEO Garrett Langley formally apologized to the community center, acknowledging "poor judgment," and the company promised increased transparency and updated privacy guardrails. The company stated: "Claims of inappropriate conduct by our employees are false."

In many cases, Flock usage is secret to protect the integrity of ongoing investigations. Some agencies provide public logs, and the website haveibeenflocked.com aggregates known logs so potential victims of privacy violations can make inquiries. In August 2026, Flock Safety announced that it would make certain safeguards mandatory for law enforcement customers, including an auditing tool designed to identify unusual search activity.

=== Misuse by law enforcement ===
A law enforcement officer is alleged to have searched Flock products on behalf of a suspect in an ongoing drug investigation.

In 2026, a review of media reports since 2024 by the Institute for Justice revealed 28 cases of law enforcement officers from across the United States abusing Flock and other ALPR systems to stalk former romantic partners. Some of these cases were discovered by private citizens and journalists through noticing patterns of abuse in public records from police departments, raising concerns about underreporting and lack of oversight by authorities. Incidents include:

- A Sedgwick, Kansas, police chief who used Flock Safety license plate readers to track his ex-girlfriend and her new boyfriend's vehicles 228 times over more than four months, and used his police vehicle to follow them.
- A Kechi, Kansas, police lieutenant who used Flock Safety license plate readers to track his estranged wife.
- A Bonner Springs, Kansas, detective who used Flock license plate readers to stalk his wife.
- A Sumter County, Florida, detective who falsified records to search for her husband's ex-wife.
- The police chief of Braselton, Georgia, who was arrested and charged after the Georgia Bureau of Investigation concluded he had misused Flock to stalk and harass several individuals, including an ex-girlfriend.
- A Pasadena, Texas, sergeant who used Flock to "track and stalk a female officer".
- A supervisor with the Conyers, Georgia, police department who used Flock to track her domestic partner's location.
- Two Greer, South Carolina, officers who were terminated for misusing Flock, one to track a former partner.
- A Niceville, Florida, officer who used Flock to track a fellow officer and that officer's spouse.
- A Menasha, Wisconsin, officer whose ex-girlfriend filed a complaint alleging he used Flock to stalk her.
- The police chief of Holiday Hills, Illinois, who used Flock to track several people he knew.
- The sheriff of Jerome County, Idaho, who used Flock to search for his wife's vehicle hundreds of times.
- A Cherry Valley, Illinois, officer's ex-wife who filed a restraining order after accusing him of stalking her with Flock cameras.
- Three Richmond County, Georgia, police officers who were terminated for allegedly misusing Flock products.
- A Milwaukee police officer who used Flock to track a woman he was dating and her ex-partner nearly 180 times over a two-month period.
- A Louisville, Kentucky, officer who was charged with multiple felonies after allegedly using the city's Flock system to track an ex-partner and her friends hundreds of times over two months.
- A Kenosha County, Wisconsin, sheriff's deputy who misused Flock over 40 times.
- A Mooresville, North Carolina, officer who used Flock to track her boyfriend's ex-wife 31 times.
- Five police officers in Albany, Georgia, who were arrested for using Flock for purposes unrelated to law enforcement.
- Two officers from Reynoldsburg, Ohio, who resigned before they were scheduled to be interviewed by an internal affairs investigation after repeatedly searching the same license plates unrelated to law enforcement.
- A Brevard County deputy sheriff, who stalked his ex-girlfriend using Flock while on and off-duty. He resigned after the investigation which also included incidents of speeding, racism, a Nazi salute, and abuse of his girlfriend, among other incidents, rather than being terminated.
- An Alpharetta, Georgia, officer who stalked his ex-romantic partner and her friend, both employed as police in the same department, by using Flock 56 times.
- A senior investigator with the sheriff's office in Albany, New York, who searched for her ex-girlfriend's license plate with Flock almost 3,000 times. The investigation was prompted by a tip from an outside source, not Flock's Audit Assistance tool.

In August 2026, Flock's CEO Garrett Langley stated that "we knew this was a risk nine years ago", and claimed that it was the reason for originally implementing audit logs, which was opt-in until August 2026, when Flock stated their "Audit Assistance" tool would be mandatory by the end of the year. Only about one third of police department customers used Audit Assistance prior to the announcement, and privacy advocates had previously asked for audit features to be made mandatory.

The Audit Assistance feature flags suspicious activity, such as repeated queries on the same vehicle, and queries made by officers outside of working hours. It also provides a now-mandatory feature that requires a criminal case number for each query. As of August 2026, 13 states make auditing mandatory, and 8 make misuse of such systems a standalone crime as opposed to a possible element of stalking or harassment.

A "network audit" obtained by local media, along with a data analysis by the EFF, demonstrated that some of Flock's transparency features could be circumvented by button mashing and entering gibberish, or terms like "LMAO", "leave me alone", and "sexy". The ACLU has claimed that the effectiveness of Flock's Audit Assistance tool had not been independently verified, and thus should be assumed to be ineffective or "window dressing".

=== False arrests and detentions ===
Innocent people have been pulled over, detained, held at gunpoint, or jailed as a result of mistakes in Flock systems:

- A Plymouth, Minnesota, car blogger and his wife were detained by police in a parking lot because Flock misread his dealer plate.
- A Cherry Hills Village, Colorado, driver was wrongly detained repeatedly after officers mistakenly put his license plate number on a Flock hotlist.
- A Sherwood, Arkansas, couple was pulled over and ordered from their car at gunpoint after a Flock camera misread a digit on their plate.
- A 23-year old Volusia County, Florida, woman is suing the Florida Highway Patrol after she was wrongfully arrested and detained for 13 days, including several spent in solitary confinement. A Flock Safety ALPR misidentified her vehicle's color and misread her tag, wrongly flagging her as a suspect in a hit and run which killed three people. According to her attorney, photo evidence shows her vehicle without damage, contradicting the arrest report citing damage on her vehicle consistent with the accident. A different motorist who had been driving the same model vehicle in a different color was later arrested and charged.
- A San Diego man was wrongly jailed for nearly a month after Flock mistook his plate for one that was at the scene of an attempted carjacking.
- A York County, South Carolina, motorist was detained at gunpoint after Flock misread a character on his license plate, flagging the car as stolen.
- Two Morristown, Tennessee, grandparents were detained at gunpoint while their three-year-old granddaughter watched from the car after a Flock camera misread an "O" on their plate as a "0".
- Toledo, Ohio, police detained an innocent driver at gunpoint, sicced their dog on him, and jailed him for several hours after a Flock camera misread a "7" on their plate as a "2".
- Sedgwick County, Kansas, sheriff's deputies detained an innocent couple at gunpoint because a Flock camera failed to distinguish between temporary and permanent license plates with the same number.
- In two separate incidents, three Española, New Mexico, high-school students were detained at gunpoint after a Flock camera misread their plates.
- A man from Jackson Township, Stark County, Ohio, is suing Flock Safety after he was pulled over and detained because officers failed to remove a license plate from a hotlist.

=== Use by ICE ===
In 2025, it was reported that Flock data had been queried for use in immigration enforcement. A pilot program of investigation with Customs and Border Protection and Homeland Security Investigations was initiated to help combat human trafficking and fentanyl distribution. Flock halted the program in August because of "confusion and concerns" about the purpose of the investigations. Local governments shared the data by either blindly approving the inquiries or unknowingly signing onto the national sharing option. Langley falsely stated that Flock did not have federal contracts.

=== Cameras kept up and placed without consent ===
In November 2025, the City of Verona voted to not renew its contract with Flock, which would expire in April and July 2026. Prior to the expiry date, Verona mayor Luke Diaz stated Flock did not remove the cameras despite multiple requests from the city since the vote. Flock later reached out to the city with a sales team, trying to sell a new contract. Flock objected to the city removing the cameras themselves when asked in early January, after which the city covered the cameras with trash bags. The cameras were later removed by Flock on February 4. Flock stated that the cameras could be remotely deactivated at any time and that they were not operating during the time they remained installed. Flock added that they have a "standard offboarding process" for camera removal and that "mid-term contract cancellations follow a separate process".

Officials in the town of Littleton, Massachusetts, also alleged five Flock Safety cameras were switched back on by the company without informing the town after the town temporarily disabled the cameras.

In late June 2026, ABC affiliate WEWS-TV in Cleveland reported that after a Flock contract with the city of Cleveland expired following a 3–1 vote against renewal, the cameras remained on and were still being used by local police. Cleveland Police sergeant Freddy Diaz stated that the cameras would remain operational "at minimum" until July 15, when another meeting with the city council would take place to allow for a secondary review of the contract. Local activists called the situation "incredibly disappointing" and called the police department's support for the technology "not compelling".

In June 2026, WSLS-TV reported that a Flock device, identified as a Flock Raven upon inspection by a police officer, was installed on a Roanoke, Virginia, homeowner's yard without prior notice. The Roanoke City Council had voted in April to approve 75 installations of Flock Raven devices, but her address was not on the approved list, and no installations were scheduled to take place until July. The Flock Raven was later removed from her property, and the city later determined that 30 of the 41 devices installed up to that point were placed in unapproved locations.

In September 2026, KTXL in Sacramento, California, reported that Flock reinstalled its ALPRs in the city of Grass Valley less than a month after the police had ended their contract with the company and removed all cameras from the city.

In September 2026, The city of Dayton, Minnesota reported that Flock had reinstalled two cameras after the city had previously notified Flock that the program was on hold, and no work orders were to be completed. The installation of the cameras followed the city cancellation of its contract in August 2026.

=== Use to investigate women seeking abortion services ===
In at least one state, law enforcement officers queried Flock products in an abortion investigation. According to a sworn affidavit by a detective in Johnson County, Texas, deputies initiated a "death investigation" of a "non-viable fetus", logged evidence of a woman's self-managed abortion in response to a report from her alleged romantic partner, and consulted prosecutors about possibly charging her. The death investigation remained open for weeks, with detectives interviewing the woman and reviewing her text messages about the abortion. Johnson County's query included 83,000 Flock cameras nationwide, including cameras in states where abortion is legal and collecting such data is explicitly prohibited by law. Johnson County sheriff Adam King denied that the investigation was related to an abortion, and Flock Safety falsely characterized it as a missing person investigation in a statement on their website, directly contradicting the sworn affidavit.

In Wisconsin, a police officer allegedly misused Flock to see if his ex-girlfriend had gone to an abortion clinic.

=== False and misleading statements ===
In November 2025, a security researcher discovered that Flock server logs were publicly available without a login; Flock has repeatedly stated that it has never experienced a data breach.

The city council of Oshkosh, Wisconsin, voted to rescind its contract with Flock in April 2026 after finding its representatives had made "false statements" about its products to the council. Later in the month, the Sheboygan, Wisconsin, police department asked the city to cover its cameras with obscuring bags and revoke its Flock contract, due to actions by the company which they felt to be untrustworthy and not to meet the city's terms. Later reporting revealed that a Flock sales representative contacted the Sheboygan engineering department offering to sell the city five years worth of traffic data.

A senior Flock publicist falsely claimed in a LinkedIn post that Flock had partnered with the ACLU of New Mexico. A Flock representative also claimed that "Flock has worked with groups like the ACLU to design an ALPR system that takes considerations they have into account" before a meeting of the Urbana, Illinois, city council. This statement was denied by the ACLU, which said, "Neither the ACLU nor any of our affiliates have ever partnered with Flock Safety or worked with them to design any ALPR system."

In July 2026, the ACLU claimed that Flock had published a blog post claiming ICE had no direct access to Flock's network, while knowing ICE had the ability to access data indirectly through state & local law enforcement agencies, which the ACLU described as misleading. Flock's CEO later stated in an interview on the podcast Outsider Inc. it was true that ICE had indirect access to Flock data, but that they "can't make that our problem as a company".

In August 2026, 404 Media claimed that Flock CEO Garrett Langley had lied about their reporting on usage of Flock to track a woman seeking an abortion in Texas. In a call to Ohio law enforcement and government officials, Langley called 404 Media's article "entirely false" and stated that the woman could not have been under investigation for having an abortion as the practice is legal in Texas, despite local authorities discussing if they could charge her with a crime. 404 Media also claimed that after information regarding her alleged abusive relationship was identified, police released a retroactive justification claiming the investigation was for the woman's safety.

In October 2026, Flock CEO Garrett Langley claimed that social media posting about Flock had dropped 95% in the past three months, that it was partially due to a recent bombing of a Russian data center, and due to "somebody" previously paying for the posts no longer paying for them. Langley also claimed protesters across the country were "not organic".
