= Garrett Langley =

Founder and CEO of Flock Safety

- Langley in a 2026 interview
- Born: 1986 or 1987 (age 39–40); Atlanta, Georgia, United States
- Education: Georgia Tech

Garrett Langley (born 1986 or 1987) is the founder and current CEO of Flock Safety. He is also the former founder of Clutch (a car subscription service) and Experience (a mobile platform for live events).

== Early life ==
Langley was born in Atlanta, Georgia, United States. As a high school student, Langley met entrepreneur Tripp Rackley. They would later collaborate on various business ventures. Langley studied electrical engineering at Georgia Tech.

== Career ==
Langley has stated that the inspiration behind Flock was police inaction regarding a series of 2017 thefts in his Atlanta neighborhood and that he was told there were limited options without more evidence such as eyewitnesses or reports regarding suspicious vehicles. Langley partnered with former classmates, Matt Feury and Paige Todd, to create a prototype for an automatic number-plate recognition device that ran on solar power and could easily be placed in public. They originally sold their invention to homeowner's associations, before becoming more focused on partnering with police departments across the United States.

Langley has stated that he believes that Flock ensures that people have a right to safety and that automated systems are less biased than human judgement. He also believes that Flock can make opportunistic crime "incredibly hard to get away with—so hard that people just choose not to do it".

== Public image ==
Langley's rhetoric regarding the role and reach of his company has been criticized across the political spectrum. A writer from The New Yorker described him as offering contradictory messaging "when faced with genuine concerns about how his product creates less safe conditions for citizens, by repressing their autonomy, freedom, and right to public space, he holds up his hands, shakes his head, and pretends that none of that is any of his business". In an interview with Click on Detroit, Langley called for greater regulation of his industry. Public backlash intensified after he was interviewed on Fox News and stated that there should be a compromise between public safety and privacy. Since then, he has avoided appearing in public, sending a letter to a U.S. Senate committee instead of being physically present.

There have been numerous attempts to doxx Langley, which led to his purported address to be blurred from public view on Google Maps, and prompted commentary regarding the perceived irony of his ability to lead a private life. Audio from Langley at the 2026 International Association of Chiefs of Police conference was leaked to 404 Media, where he falsely claimed that most of the opposition to his company came from Russian bots. He also stated that he would prefer to not engage with journalists going forward as "the media gets to say whatever they want to say about you" and that opposition to Flock would eventually subside.

== See also ==
- Surveillance capitalism
