= National Chief =

National Chief may refer to:

- National Chief, a proposed Amtrak service involving the through-running of the Southwest Chief and Capitol Limited (Amtrak train)
- National Chief, title of leader of the Assembly of First Nations

== See also ==
- National Chief Petty Officers Association
- International Association of Chiefs of Police (formerly National Chiefs of Police Union)
