= Sam Cole =

Writer and technology journalist

Samantha Cole
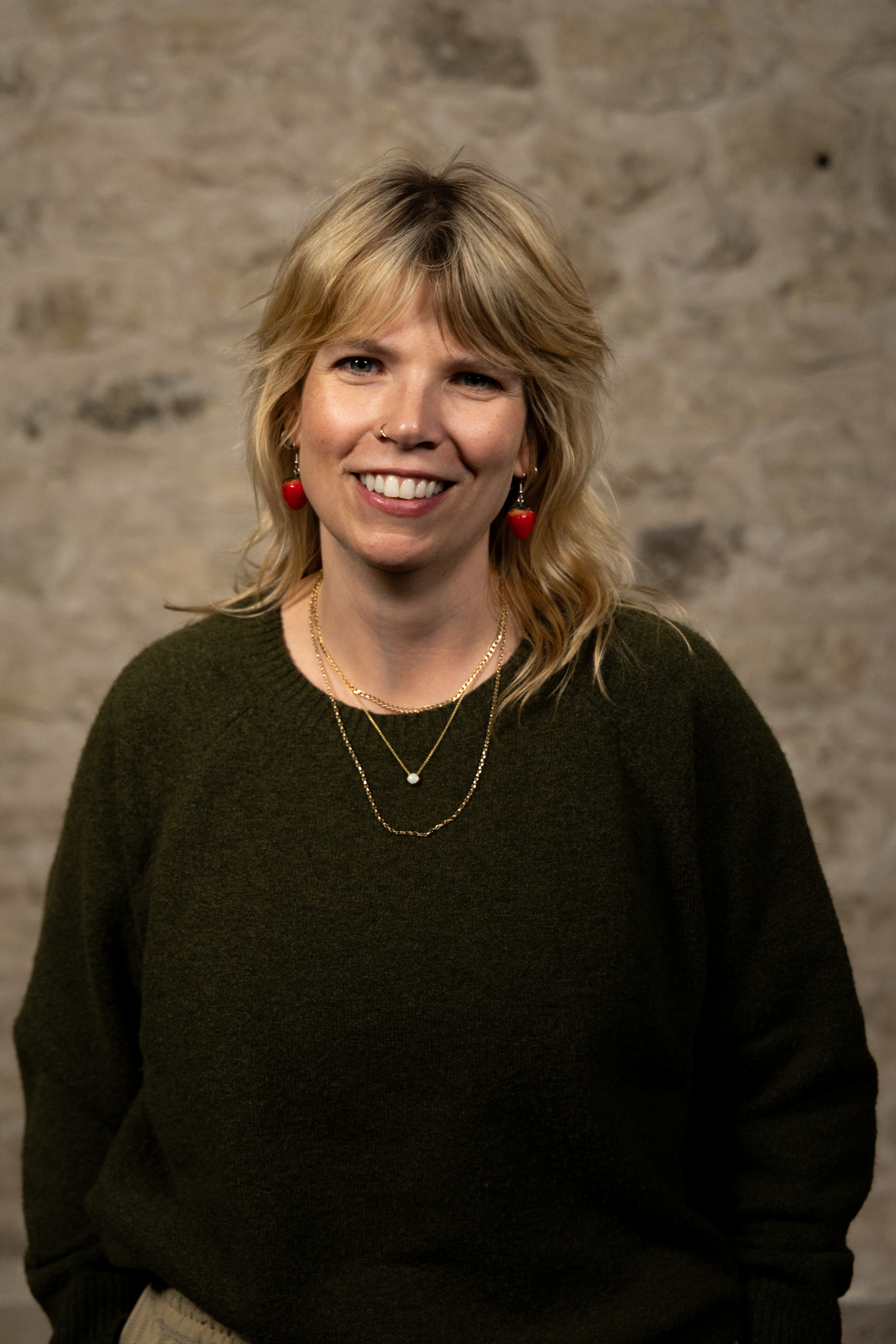
- Cole at South by Southwest in 2025
- Occupations: Technology journalist, author
- Writing career
- Notable works: How Sex Changed the Internet, and the Internet Changed Sex (2022)
- Website: samleecole.com

Samantha Cole is an American journalist, author, and co-founder of the independent technology media company 404 Media. She has covered online culture, the adult industry, and the intersection of sex and technology, and is credited with bringing mainstream attention to deepfake nude imagery. Cole is one of four co-founders of 404 Media, founded in 2023 as a journalist-owned publication. In 2024, the Electronic Frontier Foundation recognized 404 Media with an EFF Award for Fearless Journalism.

== Career ==
Cole began her career in local journalism before working as a freelance reporter for national outlets, including Popular Science, Fast Company, and Al Jazeera.

Cole later joined Motherboard, the science and technology section of Vice. At Vice, her reporting focused on sexuality, online culture, platforms, and the adult industry. In 2020, she received a Writer's Guild Award nomination for best digital news coverage.

After Vice filed for bankruptcy in 2023, Motherboard editor-in-chief Jason Koebler, former senior editors Emanuel Maiberg and Cole, and former writer Joseph Cox founded 404 Media as a journalist-owned publication. Describing the rationale behind a journalist-owned and funded venue, Cole said, “owning our own work, and being beholden to no one but our readers and colleagues — as opposed to say, investors, venture capitalists, or out-of-touch executives — feels like the future.”

== How Sex Changed the Internet and the Internet Changed Sex: An Unexpected History ==
How Sex Changed the Internet and the Internet Changed Sex: An Unexpected History, Cole's first book, covers the many intersections of sex and the evolution of the internet. The book traces the early ways the technology of the internet and sexuality came together, from explicit ASCII art to the Playboy photo used as the canonical test image by the engineers who developed the JPEG image compression standard. The book also covers how internet communities have offered new opportunities — early message boards gave a space to anonymously explore sexual identities, for example, and new homes to perennially marginalized communities — even if those promises often failed to come to fruition. The book also chronicles how corporate interests often squeeze sex workers and explicit content out of spaces originally created for and by them. Yahoo!'s acquired Tumblr, then banned explicit content, for example. This interplay continues today: payment platforms have become enforcers of content standards, yet in an unusually successful pushback, OnlyFans resisted pressure from these platforms to ban explicit content.

== Books ==
- How Sex Changed the Internet and the Internet Changed Sex: An Unexpected History (Workman Publishing Company, 2022)
