= Samantha Cole =

American singer-songwriter

- Born: Samantha Cole; October 31, 1975 (age 50)
- Origin: Southampton, New York, U.S.
- Genres: Pop, dance
- Occupations: Singer, songwriter
- Years active: 1997-present
- Labels: Universal Records, Alpha Omega Records
- Website: Official Website

Samantha Cole (born October 31, 1975) is an American singer and songwriter.

== Early life ==
Samantha Cole grew up in Southampton, New York. At the age of 15, Cole began taking vocal lessons and landed a number of singing engagements in New York.

== Career ==
Cole made some 30 appearances (and one performance) on MTV's The Grind, and became a regular performer at Tatou in New York City. Through these appearances, Cole was discovered by Universal Music's Doug Morris and Daniel Glass, and promptly signed to Universal Records.

Universal released Cole's eponymous debut studio album on September 9, 1997. Cole co-wrote eight songs on the album, which included an impressive roster of all-star producers including David Foster, Nile Rodgers, Richard Marx, Rhett Lawrence, and Diane Warren. The album was preceded by the first single, "Happy With You", which peaked at number 78 on the US Billboard Hot 100 and number 55 on the Canadian RPM 100. It also reached numbers 35 and 38 on the American pop and rhythmic radio charts published by Radio & Records, respectively. The Boston Globe described the song as a "semi-hit". "Without You", the second single, peaked at number 25 on the Radio & Records adult contemporary chart. The song was covered by American Idol stars Kimberley Locke and Clay Aiken in 2004, and went to #1 in Asia. The song is featured on Locke's album, One Love. Cole went on to release her last single from her debut album, "You Light Up My Life", in the UK in 1997.

In 2001, Cole was featured on the single "Luv Me Luv Me", by Jamaican reggae singer Shaggy. Her version of the single with Shaggy did not peak on any chart in the US, but did peak at #5 on the UK Singles Chart. In 2002, Cole teamed up with Shaggy for the second time for the song "Bring It To Me", that was featured on the Dark Angel soundtrack.

In 2005, Cole released a cover version of Animotion's 1985 hit, "Obsession". The song charted high on the Hot Dance Music/Club Play chart and gained radio airplay.

Since releasing "Obsession", she has remained a staple of New York City discothèque club scene, regularly performing to sold-out crowds. Cole has also modeled and has appeared in layouts for FHM and Loaded. She is reportedly working on her second album entitled Superwoman, on a new label, Alpha Omega Records.

Cole has also dabbled in acting, appearing in an episode of HBO's Sex and the City, the WE network reality show, Single In the Hamptons, and the Damon Dash's 2003 film, Death of a Dynasty.

== Discography ==
=== Studio albums ===
- Samantha Cole (September 9, 1997)

=== Singles ===
- "Happy with You" (August 12, 1997)
- "Without You" (December 9, 1997)
- "You Light Up My Life" (UK release) (1998)
- "Luv Me, Luv Me" (with Shaggy) (2001)
- "Obsession" (2005)
- "Bring It to Me" (2005)
- "Bring It to Me" (Dark Angel remix) (2005)
