= Samantha Cole (album) =

1997 studio album by Samantha Cole

Studio album by Samantha Cole
- Released: September 9, 1997
- Studios: Oakshire (Los Angeles): Sound Gallery (Burbank); Chartmaker (Los Angeles); Record Plant (Los Angeles); Tracken Place (Los Angeles); Music Grinder; The Loft (Bronxville, New York); The Hit Factory (New York); Whorga (New York); Banana Boat (Los Angeles); Le Crib
- Genres: Pop; pop soul; R&B
- Label: Universal
- Producers: Nile Rodgers; Rhett Lawrence; David Foster; Jon-John; Richard Marx; Carl Sturken and Evan Rogers; Jimmy Harry; Khris Kellow; Claude Gaudette

Singles from Samantha Cole
- 1. "Happy with You" Released: July 1997; 2. "Without You" Released: November 1997; 3. "Sweet Sweet Surrender" Released: December 1997

Samantha Cole is the debut album by American singer Samantha Cole. Universal Records released it on September 9, 1997.

== Release and promotion ==
=== United States and Canada ===
Universal issued Samantha Cole in the United States on September 9, 1997. The album was preceded by the release of lead single "Happy with You" in July 1997, which the label believed was suited for summer due to the composition's "upbeat" nature. The song was issued to American retail outlets as a cassette and CD single and promoted to pop, rhythmic, and adult contemporary radio stations for airplay. A moderate success, "Happy with You" peaked at number 78 on the Billboard Hot 100 and remained on the chart for five weeks. In Canada, the single rose as far as number 55 on the RPM 100 all-format airplay chart. Cole performed "Happy with You" during halftime shows at stadiums for the 1997 National Football League season.

After contemplating "Surrender to Me" and "I'm By Your Side" as follow-ups, Universal issued "Without You" as the second single in November 1997. The song reached number 25 on the Radio & Records adult contemporary airplay chart.

=== Asia ===
MCA Victor released Samantha Cole in Japan on December 17, 1997. The label issued "Sweet Sweet Surrender" as the lead single there on the same day. "Without You" followed as the second Japanese single on February 21, 1998, and experienced success across Asia. Cole participated in a promotional tour to Hong Kong, the Philippines, Singapore, Taiwan, and Thailand where she gave interviews, performed live, and attended fan meet and greets. The perfume company Estée Lauder organized several events wherein Cole promoted their fragrance "Happy" in conjunction with "Happy with You".

== Critical reception ==
Professional ratings
Review scores
| Source | Rating |
|---|---|
| The Age | 2.5/5 stars |
| AllMusic | 4/5 stars |
| The Huntsville Times | 2/5 |

Samantha Cole was viewed as having strong commercial viability. Music critics considered Cole's appearance; the album's combination of ballads, R&B songs, and covers; and the involvement of producers Foster and Rodgers as factors contributing to potential sales. Sandra Schulman of the Sun-Sentinel said Cole had "her little spike heel firmly wedged in the door to success".

Critics thought the album lacked originality. For AllMusic writer Alex Henderson, it "sounds like the result of a marketing meeting rather than true artistic inspiration". In The Virginian-Pilot, Nia Ngina Meeks suggested Samantha Cole imitated other contemporary R&B records. Cole's performance received negative comparisons to American singer Mariah Carey, whom critics thought she emulated but lacked the same vocal ability.

== Track listing ==
Standard edition
| No. | Title | Writer(s) | Producer(s) | Length |
|---|---|---|---|---|
| 1. | "Down in Love" | Russ DeSalvo; Samantha Cole; James Greco | Nile Rodgers | 3:58 |
| 2. | "Happy with You" | Cole; Berny Cosgrove; Kevin Clark | Rhett Lawrence | 3:50 |
| 3. | "I'm Right Here" | Rick Nowels; Billy Steinberg; Deborah Cox; Lascelles Stephens | David Foster | 4:25 |
| 4. | "Sometimes" | Jon-John; Cole | Jon-John | 5:07 |
| 5. | "Without You" | Foster; Richard Marx; Cole | Foster; Marx | 4:40 |
| 6. | "Surrender to Me" (duet with Richard Marx) | Marx; Ross Vannelli | Marx | 3:45 |
| 7. | "Sweet Sweet Surrender" | Evan Rogers; Carl Sturken; Cole | Carl Sturken and Evan Rogers | 4:21 |
| 8. | "Crazy" | Jimmy Harry; Cole | Harry | 4:23 |
| 9. | "I'm By Your Side" | Diane Warren | Khris Kellow | 4:56 |
| 10. | "You Light Up My Life" | Joseph Brooks | Foster; Claude Gaudette | 3:56 |
| 11. | "What You Do to Me" | Rodgers; Cole; Tom Boyd; Victor Taylor | Rodgers | 4:20 |
| 12. | "Shadow of Love" | Cole; Cosgrove; Clark | Lawrence | 4:35 |

Bonus tracks edition
| No. | Title | Length |
|---|---|---|
| 13. | "You Light Up My Life – Vocal Club Mix" |
| 14. | "You Light Up My Life – Deep Dub Mix" |
| 15. | "Without Someone" |

Disc 2: VCD
| No. | Title | Length |
|---|---|---|
| 1. | "Without You" (video) |
| 2. | "I'm By Your Side" (video) |
| 3. | "You Light Up My Life" (video) |

== Personnel ==
Musicians

- Russ DeSalvo – songwriting (1)
- Samantha Cole – songwriting (1–2, 4–5, 7–8, 11–12), background vocals (1–4, 7–9, 12)
- James Greco – songwriting (1)
- Herbie Tribino – programming, keyboards, guitars (1)
- Richard Hilton – programming, keyboards (1)
- Audrey Martells – background vocals (1)
- Nile Rodgers – producer (1, 11), guitars (1, 11), songwriting (11)
- Berny Cosgrove – songwriting (2, 12)
- Kevin Clark – songwriting (2, 12)
- Rhett Lawrence – producer (2, 12), arranger (2, 12), keyboards (2, 12), programming (2, 12), synthesizer (2)
- Jason Edmonds – background vocals (2)
- Michael White – background vocals (2)
- Valerie Davis – background vocals (2)
- Rick Nowels – songwriting (3)
- Billy Steinberg – songwriting (3)
- Deborah Cox – songwriting (3)
- Lascelles Stephens – songwriting (3)
- David Foster – producer (3, 5, 10), arranger (3, 5, 10), keyboards (3, 5, 10), strings arranger (10)
- Simon Franglen – Synclavier programming (3, 5)
- Michael Thompson – guitars (3, 5–6, 9–10)
- Sue Ann Carwell – background vocals (3, 5)
- Barrington Henderson – background vocals (3, 5)
- Jon-John – songwriting, producer, drum programming, music arranger (4)
- Latina Webb – background vocals (4)
- Marc Nelson – background vocals, background vocals arranger (4)
- Reggie Hamilton – bass (4)
- Reggie Griffin – guitar (4)
- Richard Marx – songwriting (5–6), producer (5–6), arranger (5–6), background vocals (5), keyboards (6)
- Nita Whitaker – background vocals (5)
- Ross Vanelli – songwriting (6)
- Phil Shenale – keyboard programming (6)
- Evan Rogers – songwriting, producer, arranger, background vocals (7)
- Carl Sturken – songwriting, producer, arranger, all instruments (7)
- Audrey Wheeler – background vocals (7)
- Jimmy Harry – songwriting, producer, keyboards, guitars, programming (8)
- Pat Vixama – background vocals (8)
- Diane Warren – songwriting, executive producer (9)
- Khris Kellow – producer, arranger, keyboards, percussion, background vocals (9)
- Joseph Brooks – songwriting (10)
- Claude Gaudette – producer, arranger, synth programming (10)
- Jerry Hey – strings arranger (10)
- John JR Robinson – drums (10)
- Tom Boyd – songwriting (11)
- Victor Taylor – songwriting, programming, keyboards (11)
- Richard Hilton – programming, keyboards (11)
- Deborah Cole – background vocals (11)
- Keith Jon – background vocals (12)
- Todd Chapman – synth programming (12)

Technical

- Gary Tole – engineering (1, 11), mixing (1, 11)
- Andy Grassi – engineering (1)
- Budd Tunick – production manager (1, 11)
- Joanie Morris – production coordinator (2, 12)
- Eric White – engineering (2, 12)
- Bill Carr – engineering (2, 12)
- Bryan Golder – engineering (2, 12)
- Rhett Lawrence – engineering (2, 12)
- Dave "Hard Drive" Pensado – engineering (2, 12)
- Felipe Elgueta – engineering (3, 5, 10)
- Ian Boxill – engineering (4)
- Bill Drescher – engineering (6), mixing (6)
- David Bryant – assistant engineering (6)
- Steve Kinsey – assistant mixing (6)
- Al Hemberger – engineering (7)
- Bob Rosa – engineering (7), mixing (7)
- Colleen Reynolds – production manager (7)
- Tony Black – assistant engineering (7)
- Greg Thompson – assistant engineering (7)
- Ted Wilson – assistant engineering (7)
- Tony Maserati – mixing (8)
- Glen Marchese – engineering (8)
- Mario Luccy – engineering (9)
- Khris Kellow – engineering (9)
- Al Schmidt – strings engineering (10)
