= Henri Gisquet =

French banker and Préfet de Police

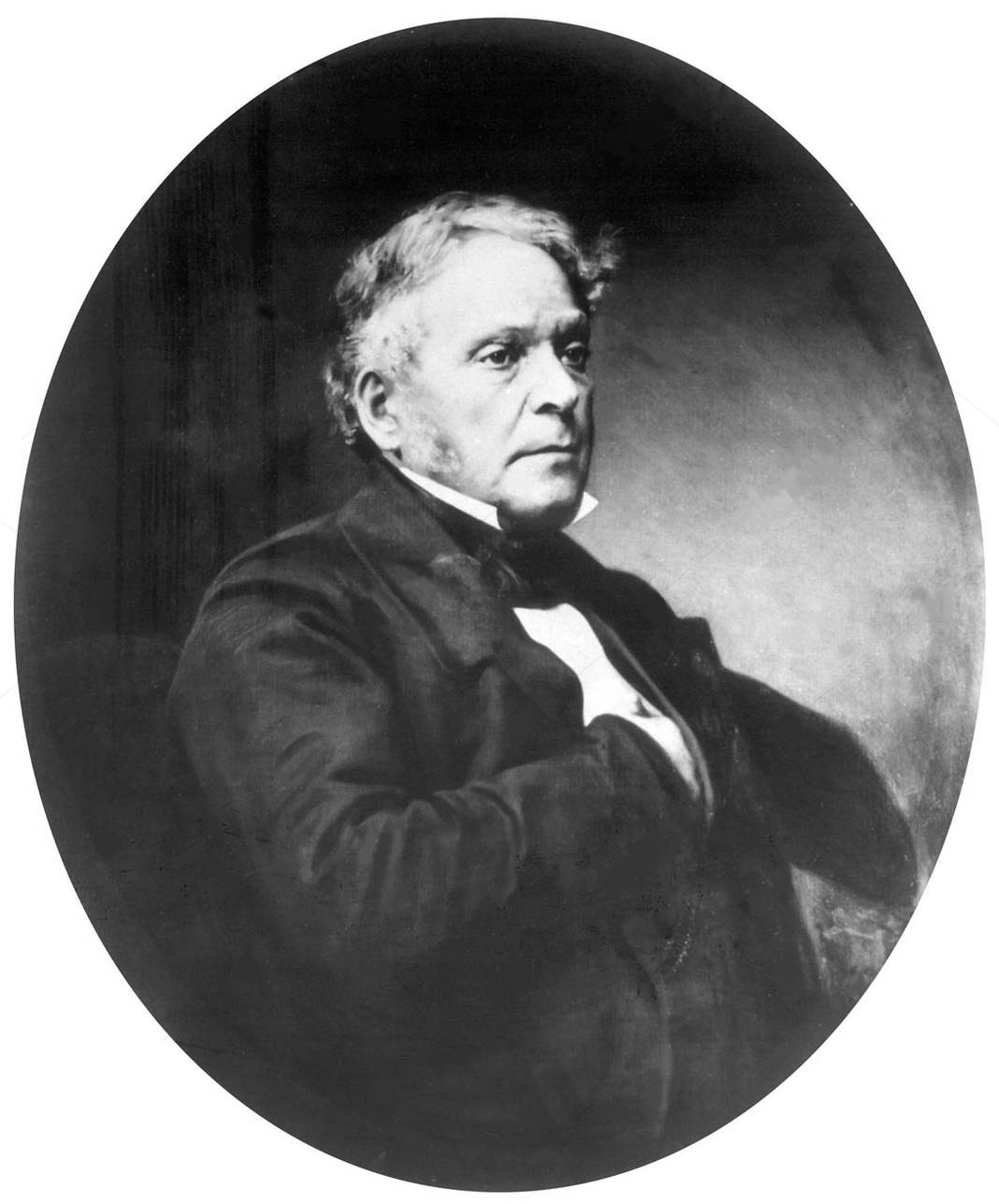
Henri Gisquet

Henri Gisquet (14 July 1792 – 23 January 1866) was a French banker and Préfet de Police.
