= International Association of Chiefs of Police =

International police organization

- Abbreviation: IACP
- Founded: May 1893; 133 years ago
- Founders: 47 chiefs of police
- Tax ID no.: 53-0227813
- Legal status: 501(c)(3) nonprofit organization
- Purpose: To advance the policing profession through advocacy, research, outreach, and education in order to provide for safer communities worldwide.
- Headquarters: Alexandria, Virginia, United States
- President: Ken Walker
- Executive Director: Vincent Talucci
- Chief Executive Officer: Vincent Talucci
- Employees: 135 (2021)
- Website: www.theiacp.org
- Formerly called: National Chiefs of Police Union

International Association of Chiefs of Police (IACP) is a 501(c)(3) nonprofit organization based in Alexandria, Virginia. It is the world's largest professional association for police leaders.

== Magazine ==
The IACP is the publisher of the Police Chief magazine.

== Conference ==
The IACP hosts an annual conference for public officials. The conference gives out an award to 40 police officers each year that the organization believes represent exemplary conduct.

The 2026 event had an estimated 16,000 attendees and included an interview with Flock Safety CEO Garrett Langley.

== See also ==
- Quinn Tamm
