= 404 Media =

Digital media company

- Unparalleled access to hidden worlds both online and IRL.
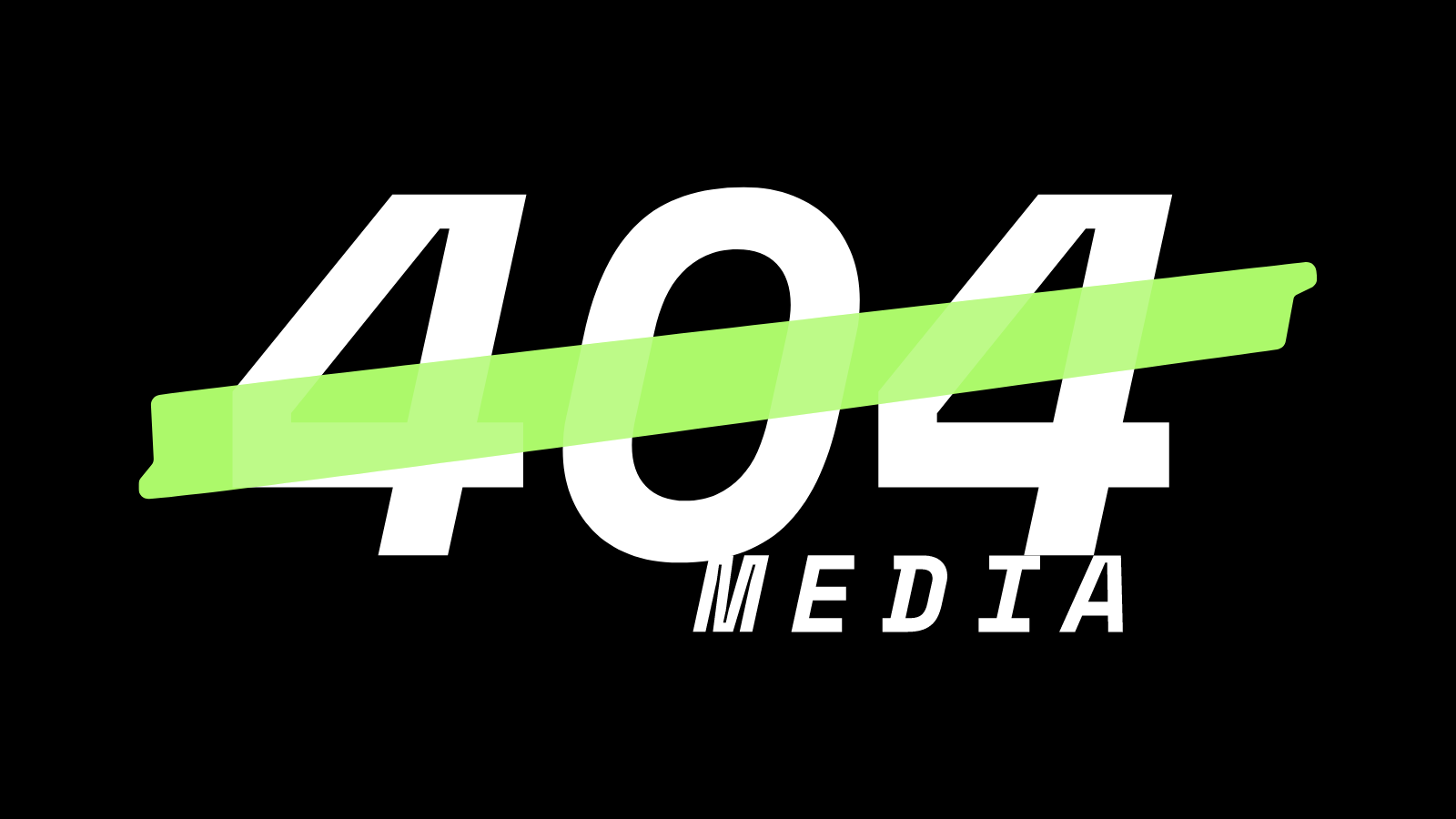

- Screenshot Screenshot of the website in November 2023
- Format: Digital
- Owner(s): Dark Mode, LLC
- Founders: Jason Koebler; Samantha Cole; Emanuel Maiberg; Joseph Cox
- Founded: August 22, 2023; 3 years ago
- Website: 404media.co

404 Media is an online, independent news publication that focuses on technology and internet reporting. It covers topics such as artificial intelligence, hacking, sex work, niche online communities, and the right-to-repair movement. Owned by its reporters, it functions as a journalism cooperative. It received an EFF Pioneer Award in 2024.

== History ==
The founders of 404 Media in 2023 (left to right): Joseph Cox, Sam Cole, Jason Koebler, and Emanuel Maiberg.

404 Media was founded in 2023 by former staff members of Vice Media's Motherboard after Vice filed for bankruptcy. Its founding members were former editor-in-chief Jason Koebler, former senior editors Emanuel Maiberg and Sam Cole, and former writer Joseph Cox. Fast Company summarized the outlet's creation as "a spartan setup consisting of a Stripe account and the Ghost web-hosting platform".

In November 2024, 404 Media entered an agreement with Wired to co-publish two articles a month on the magazine's website.

== Business model ==
404 Media is reporter-owned, a model inspired by organizations such as Defector Media and Hell Gate. The company offers paid subscription plans at several tiers, with a base subscription costing $10 monthly or $100 annually.

In January 2024, the publication began requiring email addresses to deter artificial intelligence article spinners from scraping its content to publish on other websites.

In February 2024, 404 Media was reported to be profitable.

== Notable reports and coverage ==
=== Artificial intelligence investigations ===
In January 2024, 404 Media reported that AI-generated rewrites of its articles appeared on spam websites, with some prioritized over the original article on Google Search.

Also in January 2024, a 404 Media investigation discovered that images in the Taylor Swift deepfake pornography controversy originated from the website 4chan and were distributed via the Telegram messaging service before appearing on social media platforms.

In February 2024, 404 Media released a report alleging that Tumblr and WordPress were selling users' data to AI companies OpenAI and Midjourney for training purposes. The same month, the outlet covered how ghost kitchens used generative AI to create product images in food delivery apps DoorDash and Grubhub.

In November 2024, 404 Media published an article about how Wikipedia is responding to an influx of edits made with generative AI.

=== Mobile Fortify app ===
In June 2025, 404 Media first covered the use of the facial recognition Mobile Fortify app that ICE agents were using. The app draws from a database of over 200 million images, and can take contactless biometrics of people at whom the agents point their ICE-issued phones.

The app is said to use only federal databases (such as the National Crime Information Center, NLETS systems, and U.S. Customs and Border Protection systems), but concerns have been raised about whether it will incorporate commercially available databases. Concerns about the technology's reliability have also been raised.

== Reception ==
In an article about 2024 media industry layoffs, the Financial Times highlighted 404 Media as a successful new media venture amid an "existential crisis" in the industry. The article recognized the publication for its "eye-catching range of stories about the tech sector" and highlighted its profitability.

In 2024, 404 Media received an EFF Award for its "incisive investigative reports, deep-dive features, blogs, and scoops".

== See also ==
- Citizen Lab (U of Toronto)
- Digital rights
- European Digital Rights (EDRi)
- Electronic Frontier Canada
- Electronic Frontier Foundation
- Electronic Frontiers Australia
- Freedom of the Press Foundation
- Information freedom
- Internet censorship
- Open Rights Group (UK-based)
- Political repression of cyber-dissidents
- Protection of Broadcasts and Broadcasting Organizations Treaty
- Reporters Without Borders
