= Shaggy discography =

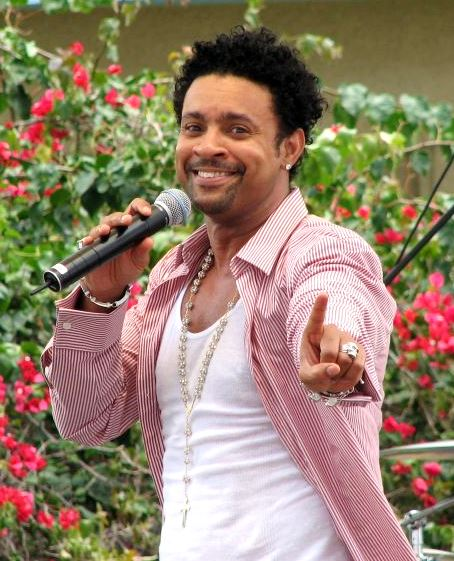
- Shaggy in 2006
- Studio albums: 17
- Compilation albums: 7
- Singles: 89
- Music videos: 47

Jamaican-American singer Shaggy has released seventeen studio albums, seven compilation albums, eighty-eight singles, and forty-seven music videos. He is best known for his hit singles "Oh Carolina", "Boombastic", "It Wasn't Me", and "Angel". In 2000, Shaggy released the album Hot Shot, which was certified 6× Platinum in the United States. The album featured the singles "It Wasn't Me" and "Angel", the latter of which was built around two song samples – Merrilee Rush's 1968 hit "Angel of the Morning" (which was remade in 1981 by Juice Newton), and The Steve Miller Band's 1973 hit "The Joker". In 2001 Shaggy performed with Rayvon and Rikrok at Michael Jackson's 30th anniversary the songs "Angel" and "It Wasn't Me" from Hot Shot. The album hit number one on the US Billboard 200 and UK Albums Chart. As of 2007, Shaggy has sold over 20 million albums worldwide.

== Albums ==
=== Studio albums ===
List of albums, with selected chart positions
Title	Album details	Peak chart positions										Sales	Certifications
Title	Album details	US	AUS	AUT	CAN	FRA	GER	NL	NZ	SWI	UK	Sales	Certifications
Pure Pleasure	Released: August 24, 1993; Label: Greensleeves; Format: CD, MC, LP	—	98	11	—	—	75	—	46	32	67		
Original Doberman	Released: May 14, 1994; Label: Greensleeves; Format: CD, MC, LP	—	—	—	—	—	—	—	—	—	—		
Boombastic	Released: July 11, 1995; Label: Virgin; Format: CD, MC, LP	34	11	25	—	—	24	30	10	35	37		BPI: Silver; MC: Gold; RIAA: Platinum
Midnite Lover	Released: August 24, 1997; Label: Virgin; Format: CD, MC, LP	—	—	—	—	—	—	—	—	—	—		
Hot Shot	Released: August 8, 2000; Label: MCA; Format: CD, MC, LP	1	2	2	1	5	1	3	2	1	1	US: 6,800,000	ARIA: 4× Platinum; BPI: 3× Platinum; IFPI AUT: Gold; IFPI SWI: Platinum; MC: 7× Platinum; RIAA: 6× Platinum; RMNZ: 4× Platinum; SNEP: Gold
Lucky Day	Released: October 29, 2002; Label: MCA; Format: CD, LP	24	75	20	5	53	35	46	38	38	54	US: 352,000	MC: Platinum; RIAA: Gold
Clothes Drop	Released: September 2, 2005; Label: Geffen; Format: CD, LP, digital download	144	—	61	44	70	62	—	—	31	—	US: 40,000	
Intoxication	Released: October 22, 2007; Label: VP; Format: CD, digital download	—	—	—	—	82	—	—	—	95	—		
Shaggy & Friends	Released: January 19, 2011; Label: Scikron, Big Yard; Format: Digital download	—	—	—	—	—	—	—	—	—	—		
Summer in Kingston	Released: July 19, 2011; Label: Ranch, MRI; Format: CD, digital download	141	—	—	—	—	—	—	—	—	—		
Rise	Released: September 28, 2012; Label: Ranch; Format: CD, digital download	—	—	—	—	—	—	—	—	—	—		
One of Many, One Music	Released: October 1, 2013; Label: Ranch; Format: CD, digital download	—	—	—	—	—	—	—	—	—	—		
44/876 (with Sting)	Released: April 20, 2018; Label: A&M; Format: CD, LP, digital download	40	38	6	19	—	1	16	—	5	9		SNEP: Gold
Wah Gwaan?!	Released: May 10, 2019; Label: Ranch; Format: CD, LP, digital download	—	—	—	—	—	—	—	—	—	—		
Hot Shot 2020	Released: July 10, 2020; Label: Ranch; Format: CD, LP, digital download	—	—	—	—	—	—	—	—	—	—		
Christmas in the Islands	Released: November 20, 2020; Label: BMG; Format: CD, digital download	—	—	—	—	—	—	—	—	—	—		
Com Fly Wid Mi	Released: May 25, 2022; Label: Mr Luva Luva; Format: digital download	—	—	—	—	—	—	—	—	—	—		
Lottery	Released: May 15, 2026; Label: VP; Format: CD, LP, digital download	—	—	—	—	—	—	—	—	—	—		
"—" denotes releases that did not chart or were not released in that territory.

=== Compilation albums ===
List of albums, with selected chart positions
Title	Album details	Peak chart positions		Certifications
Title	Album details	US	UK	Certifications
Hot Shot: Ultramix	Released: January 9, 2002; Label: MCA; Format: CD	168	—	
Mr. Lover Lover: The Best of Shaggy...Part 1	Released: January 29, 2002; Label: MCA; Format: CD	—	20	BPI: Silver
Boombastic Hits	Released: November 6, 2003; Label: MCA; Format: CD	—	—	
The Best of Shaggy	Released: August 4, 2008; Label: MCA; Format: CD	—	—	
Best of Shaggy: The Boombastic Collection	Released: August 25, 2008; Label: Geffen; Format: CD, digital download	—	22	BPI: Gold
The Essential	Released: 2012; Label: EMI; Format: CD	—	—	
SMix – Mr. Lover Collection	Released: August 2, 2014; Label: Ranch, MRI; Format: CD, digital download	—	—	
"—" denotes releases that did not chart or were not released in that territory.

== Extended plays ==
List of EPs, with selected details
Title	EP details
In the Mood	Released: May 12, 2023; Label: VP Music Group; Format: streaming

== Singles ==
=== As lead artist ===
List of singles as lead artist, with selected chart positions and certifications, showing year released and album name
Title	Year	Peak chart positions										Certifications	Album
Title	Year	US	AUS	AUT	CAN	FRA	GER	NL	NZ	SWI	UK	Certifications	Album
"Oh Carolina"	1993	59	5	2	38	33	3	6	2	3	1	ARIA: Gold; BPI: Gold; BVMI: Gold	Pure Pleasure
"Nice and Lovely"	1993	—	—	—	—	—	—	—	10	—	—		Pure Pleasure
"Soon Be Done"	1993	—	—	—	—	—	—	—	9	—	46		Pure Pleasure
"Big Up" (featuring Rayvon)	1993	—	—	—	—	—	—	—	—	—	—		Non-album single
"In the Summertime" (featuring Rayvon)	1995	3	14	35	—	—	60	21	4	—	5	BPI: Silver	Boombastic
"Boombastic"	1995	3	1	2	—	7	2	4	1	3	1	ARIA: Platinum; BPI: Platinum; BVMI: Gold; IFPI AUT: Gold; RIAA: Platinum; RMNZ: 2× Platinum; SNEP: Gold	Boombastic
"Why You Treat Me So Bad" (featuring Grand Puba)	1996	—	93	—	—	—	—	47	20	—	11		Boombastic
"Something Different" (featuring Wayne Wonder)	1996	—	—	—	—	—	—	—	22	—	21		Boombastic
"The Train Is Coming" (featuring Ken Boothe)	1996	—	—	—	—	—	—	—	—	—	21		Boombastic
"Day Oh"	1996	—	—	—	—	—	—	—	—	—	—		Boombastic
"Piece of My Heart" (featuring Marsha)	1997	72	—	—	—	—	—	—	6	—	7		Midnite Lover
"My Dream"	1997	—	—	—	—	—	—	—	—	—	—		Midnite Lover
"Luv Me, Luv Me" (featuring Janet Jackson)	1998	75	—	—	36	—	—	—	—	—	—		How Stella Got Her Groove Back
"It Wasn't Me" (featuring Rikrok)	2000	1	1	3	18	1	4	1	6	1	1	ARIA: 3× Platinum; BPI: 5× Platinum; BVMI: Gold; IFPI AUT: Gold; IFPI SWI: Gold; RMNZ: 7× Platinum; SNEP: Platinum	Hot Shot
"Angel" (featuring Rayvon)	2000	1	1	1	—	8	1	1	4	1	1	ARIA: 3× Platinum; BPI: Platinum; BVMI: Platinum; IFPI AUT: Platinum; IFPI SWI: Platinum; RMNZ: 4× Platinum	Hot Shot
"Luv Me, Luv Me" (featuring Samantha Cole)	2001	—	10	23	—	60	36	24	34	13	5	ARIA: Gold; RMNZ: Gold	Hot Shot
"Dance & Shout"	2001	—	54	3	12	—	52	85	34	75	19		Hot Shot
"Hope" (featuring King Mydas)	2001	—	42	3	—	—	52	7	34	40	19	RMNZ: Gold	Hot Shot
"Me Julie" (with Ali G)	2002	—	13	11	—	71	12	6	37	33	2	ARIA: Gold; BPI: Silver	Ali G Indahouse – Da Soundtrack
"Hey Sexy Lady" (featuring Brian and Tony Gold)	2002	—	4	9	4	5	10	4	29	18	10	ARIA: Platinum; MC: Platinum; RMNZ: Platinum	Lucky Day
"Strength of a Woman"	2003	—	31	14	15	—	23	67	50	26	—	MC: Gold	Lucky Day
"Get My Party On" (featuring Chaka Khan)	2003	—	41	26	—	26	20	—	—	33	—		Lucky Day
"Wild 2Nite" (featuring Olivia)	2005	—	—	—	—	—	40	59	—	26	61		Clothes Drop
"Ultimatum" (featuring Na'sha)	2006	—	—	—	—	—	—	—	—	66	76		Clothes Drop
"Church Heathen"	2007	—	—	—	—	—	—	—	—	—	—		Intoxication
"Bonafide Girl" (featuring Rikrok)	2008	—	—	—	—	—	71	—	—	—	—		Intoxication
"What's Love" (featuring Akon)	2008	—	—	—	—	—	52	—	—	—	—		Intoxication
"Feel the Rush" (featuring Trix and Flix)	2008	—	—	2	—	24	1	59	—	6	—		Intoxication
"Fly High" (featuring Gary Pine)	2009	—	—	22	—	31	43	—	—	53	—		Rise
"Save a Life"	2009	—	—	—	—	—	—	—	—	—	—		Non-album singles
"Rise Again"	2010	—	—	—	—	—	—	—	—	—	—		Non-album singles
"For Ur Eyez Only" (featuring Alaine)	2010	—	—	—	—	—	—	—	—	—	—		Non-album singles
"Two Places" (featuring Hezron)	2010	—	—	—	—	—	—	—	—	—	—		Non-album singles
"Girls File"	2010	—	—	—	—	—	—	—	—	—	—		Non-album singles
"Fired Up (Fuck the Rece$$ion)" (featuring Pitbull)	2011	—	—	—	—	—	—	—	—	—	—		Summer in Kingston
"Sugarcane"	2011	—	—	—	—	—	—	—	—	—	—		Summer in Kingston
"Girlz Dem Love We" (featuring Mavado)	2011	—	—	—	—	—	—	—	—	—	—		Non-album singles
"Jamaican Drummer Boy"	2011	—	—	—	—	—	—	—	—	—	—		Non-album singles
"Dame" (featuring Kat Deluna)	2012	—	—	—	—	—	—	—	—	—	—		Summer in Kingston
"World Citizen" (featuring Jahcoustix)	2012	—	—	—	—	—	18	—	—	—	—		Rise
"Girls Just Wanna Have Fun" (featuring Eve)	2012	—	—	47	—	74	29	—	—	—	—		Rise
"Remain in Our Hearts" (with Hidrro featuring Pallaso)	2014	—	—	—	—	—	—	—	—	—	—		SMix – Mr. Lover Compilation
"I Need Your Love" (featuring Mohombi, Faydee and Costi)	2014	66	—	75	74	147	91	10	—	—	36	RIAA: Gold; BPI: Silver	Non-album singles
"Only Love" (featuring Pitbull and Gene Noble)	2015	—	—	—	—	—	—	—	—	—	—		Non-album singles
"I Got You" (featuring Jovi Rockwell)	2016	—	—	—	—	—	—	—	—	—	—		Non-album singles
"That Love"	2016	—	—	—	—	—	—	—	—	—	—		Non-album singles
"Da Bar"	2016	—	—	—	—	—	—	—	—	—	—		Non-album singles
"Seasons" (featuring Omi)	2017	—	—	—	—	—	—	—	—	—	—		Non-album singles
"Promises" (featuring Romain Virgo)	2017	—	—	—	—	—	—	—	—	—	—		Non-album singles
"Don't Make Me Wait" (with Sting)	2018	—	—	—	—	—	—	—	—	—	—		44/876
"Why" (with Massari)	2018	—	—	—	—	—	—	—	—	—	—		Tune In
"Tu Pum Pum" (with Karol G featuring El Capitaan and Sekuence)	2018	—	—	—	—	—	—	—	—	—	—		Non-album single
"Gotta Get Back My Baby" (with Sting featuring Maître Gims)	2018	—	—	—	—	—	—	—	—	—	—		44/876
"Party Every Night"	2018	—	—	—	—	—	—	—	—	—	—		Non-album single
"Use Me"	2018	—	—	—	—	—	—	—	—	—	—		Wah Gwaan?!
"Just One Lifetime" (with Sting)	2019	—	—	—	—	—	—	—	—	—	—		44/876
"You" (featuring Alexander Stewart)	2019	—	—	—	—	—	—	—	—	—	—		Wah Gwaan?!
"Bromance (2k18 Remix)" (with Marc Mysterio)	2019	—	—	—	—	—	—	—	—	—	—		Non-album singles
"Endless Summer 2k19" (with Oceana and Dhany)	2019	—	—	—	—	—	—	—	—	—	—		Non-album singles
"Fly High" (featuring Gary Nesta Pine and RJ Maine)	2019	—	—	—	—	—	—	—	—	—	—		Non-album singles
"Christmas with Friends" (featuring Gene Noble)	2019	—	—	—	—	—	—	—	—	—	—		Non-album singles
"Silent Night (Christmas Is Coming)" (with Sting)	2019	—	—	—	—	—	—	—	—	—	—		Non-album singles
"It Wasn't Me (Hot Shot 2020)" (featuring Rayvon)	2020	—	—	—	—	—	—	—	—	—	—		Hot Shot 2020
"Algoritmo" (with Willie Peyote and Don Joe)	2020	—	—	—	—	—	—	—	—	—	—		Non-album singles
"Fuego (Remix)" (with Steven Malcolm)	2020	—	—	—	—	—	—	—	—	—	—		Non-album singles
"Vittu (Remix)" (with Hugh G Reksion)	2020	—	—	—	—	—	—	—	—	—	—		Non-album singles
"Please Pickup the Phone" (with Hugh G Reksion and Marc Mysterio)	2020	—	—	—	—	—	—	—	—	—	—		Non-album singles
"Early in the Morning" (with Kris Kross Amsterdam and Conor Maynard)	2021	—	—	—	—	—	—	3	—	—	—		Non-album singles
"Mood" (featuring Kes)	2022	—	—	—	—	—	—	—	—	—	—		In the Mood
"Gyal Dem Time" (with Teejay)	2023	—	—	—	—	—	—	—	—	—	—		Non-album single
"Don't Run" (featuring Skinny Fabulous)	2023	—	—	—	—	—	—	—	—	—	—		In the Mood
"Til A Mawnin" (featuring Sting)	2025	—	—	—	—	—	—	—	—	—	—		Lottery
"Boom Body" (featuring Akon,Aidonia)	2025	—	—	—	—	—	—	—	—	—	—		Lottery
"Dancehall Nice" (featuring Beres Hammond,Dexta Daps)	2026	—	—	—	—	—	—	—	—	—	—		Lottery
"Looking Lovely" (featuring Robin Thicke)	2026	—	—	—	—	—	—	—	—	—	—		Lottery
"Lottery" (featuring Jeremih)	2026	—	—	—	—	—	—	—	—	—	—		Lottery
"—" denotes releases that did not chart or were not released in that territory.

=== As featured artist ===
List of singles as lead artist, with selected chart positions and certifications, showing year released and album name
Title	Year	Peak chart positions										Certifications	Album
Title	Year	AUS	AUT	CAN	GER	NL	NZ	SWE	SWI	UK	US	Certifications	Album
"That Girl" (Maxi Priest featuring Shaggy)	1996	10	29	4	52	35	10	15	29	15	20	ARIA: Gold	Man with the Fun
"I Got You Babe" (Merril Bainbridge featuring Shaggy)	1998	62	—	—	—	—	—	—	—	—	—		Between the Days
"Sexy Girl" (Eric Singleton featuring Shaggy)	2000	—	—	—	—	—	—	—	—	—	—		non-album single
"Christmas in Jamaica" (Toni Braxton featuring Shaggy)	2001	—	—	—	—	—	—	—	—	—	103		Snowflakes
"Gebt das Hanf frei!" (Stefan Raab featuring Shaggy)	2002	—	13	—	4	—	—	—	40	—	—		non-album singles
"Your Eyes" (Rikrok featuring Shaggy)	2004	—	—	—	—	—	—	—	—	57	—		non-album singles
"Feel Like Makin' Love" (Lumidee featuring Shaggy)	2007	—	—	—	—	—	—	—	—	—	—		Unexpected
"Like a Superstar" (Trix and Flix featuring Shaggy)	2008	—	—	—	100	—	—	—	52	—	—		non-album single
"Donya" (Arash featuring Shaggy)	2008	—	—	—	—	—	—	—	—	—	—		Donya
"Don't Wanna Fight" (Qwote featuring Shaggy)	2008	—	—	—	—	—	—	—	—	—	—		Qwote UnQwuote
"Sunglasses (Keep Ya Shades On)" (Bruckup featuring Shaggy)	2009	—	—	—	—	—	—	—	—	—	—		non-album singles
"Murderer" (Barrington Levy featuring Wyclef Jean, Shaggy and Snoop Dogg)	2010	—	—	—	—	—	—	—	—	—	—		non-album singles
"I Wanna" (Bob Sinclar and Sahara featuring Shaggy)	2010	—	—	—	87	84	—	—	46	—	—		Made in Jamaïca
"Target" (Lecca featuring Shaggy)	2010	—	—	—	—	—	—	—	—	—	—		Power Butterfly
"She's a Lady" (Ali Campbell featuring Shaggy)	2011	—	—	—	—	—	—	—	—	—	—		non-album singles
"Cheap & Clean" (Khago featuring Shaggy and Red Fox)	2011	—	—	—	—	—	—	—	—	—	—		non-album singles
"Champagne" (Sahara featuring Shaggy)	2011	—	—	—	—	—	—	—	—	—	—		non-album singles
"Smile" (Tamer Hosney featuring Shaggy)	2011	—	—	—	—	—	—	—	—	—	—		non-album singles
"Vas-y Molo" (Magic System featuring Shaggy, Kore and Mohamed Allaoua)	2011	—	—	—	—	—	—	—	—	—	—		Raï'n'B fever 4
"Under the Sun" (Ida Corr featuring Shaggy)	2012	—	—	—	—	—	—	—	—	—	—		Under the Sun
"Football Is My Life" (Leo Aberer featuring Shaggy)	2012	—	—	—	—	—	—	—	—	—	—		non-album singles
"Lengua" (Beatriz Luengo featuring Shaggy and Toy Selectah)	2012	—	—	—	—	—	—	—	—	—	—		non-album singles
"Báilame" (Yandel featuring Shaggy and Alex Sensation)	2015	—	—	—	—	—	—	—	—	—	—		Dangerous
"Passion" (Andrea and Otilia featuring Shaggy and Costi)	2015	—	—	—	—	—	—	—	—	—	—		non-album singles
"City of Love" (Martin's Remix) (Mylène Farmer featuring Shaggy)	2016	—	—	—	—	—	—	—	—	—	—		non-album singles
"Don't You Need Somebody" (RedOne featuring Enrique Iglesias, R. City, Serayah and Shaggy)	2016	—	—	—	—	—	—	7	19	—	—		non-album singles
"Let Me Love You" (DJ Rebel and Mohombi featuring Shaggy)	2016	—	—	—	—	—	—	—	—	—	—		non-album singles
"Say No More" (Didi J featuring Shaggy)	2017	—	—	—	—	—	—	—	—	—	—		non-album singles
"High" (Eva Shaw featuring Shaggy and Demarco)	2018	—	—	—	—	—	—	—	—	—	—		non-album singles
"Banana" (Conkarah featuring Shaggy)	2020	—	67	61	72	1	—	—	61	—	—	RMNZ: Gold	non-album singles
"Go Down Deh" (Spice featuring Sean Paul and Shaggy)	2021	—	—	—	—	—	—	—	—	—	—	RMNZ: Gold	10
"—" denotes releases that did not chart or were not released in that territory.

=== Promotional singles ===
List of singles, with selected chart positions, showing year released and album name
Title	Year	Peak chart positions			Album
Title	Year	US	US Pop	US R&B	Album
"Freaky Girl" (featuring The Kraft)	2001	122	37	119	Hot Shot

== Guest appearances ==
- "Waste Time" with Cutty Ranks on the album Six Million Ways to Die (1996)
- "Toro Toro" with Machel Montano on the album Charge (1998)
- "Innosense" with Darwin's Waiting Room on the album Orphan (2001)
- "Ghetto Child" with Joe featuring Boys Choir of Harlem
- "Hot" with Play on the album Replay (2003)
- "All Through the Night" with Cyndi Lauper on the album The Body Acoustic (2005)
- "Rain" with Heather Headley on the album In My Mind (2006)
- "Famous" with Ai on the album What's Goin' on Ai (2006)
- "The Way We Roll" with Elephant Man on the album Let's Get Physical (2007)
- "Winning Season" with Machel Montano on the album Flame On (2008)
- "I Wanna" with Bob Sinclar and Sahara on the album Made in Jamaica (2010)
- "So Hot" with Honorebel on the album Club Scene (2010)
- "Find Your Love" with Drake on the album Thank Me Later (2010)
- "Sexy Swag" with Gabry Ponte (2013)
- "Keep Cool" with Major Lazer on the album Free the Universe (2013, also features Wynter Gordon)
- "I Need Your Love" with Faydee, Costi and Mohombi (2014)
- "Piensas (Dile la verdad) (Spanglish Remix)" with Pitbull featuring Gente de Zona (2015)
- "Black and White" with Kylie Minogue and Fernando Garibay on the album Kylie + Garibay (2015)
- "Sunset" with Farruko and Nicky Jam (2015)
- "Te Quiero Mas" with Don Omar, Faydee, Costi, Farruko and Mohombi (2015)
- "Casual Love" with Jordin Sparks on the album Right Here Right Now (2015)
- "City of Love (Martin Kierszenbaum Remix)" with Mylène Farmer on the single (2016)
- "Let Me Love You" with Mohombi and DJ Rebel (2016)
- "Don't You Need Somebody" with RedOne (2016)
- "Don't Make Me Wait" with Sting (2018)
