= The Best of Shaggy =

Greatest hits album by Shaggy
- Released: August 4, 2008
- Recorded: 1993–1998
- Genre: Reggae, dancehall
- Length: 46:03
- Label: EMI, Virgin
- Producer: O. Burell

Shaggy chronology
Intoxication (2007)	The Best of Shaggy (2008)	Best of Shaggy: The Boombastic Collection (2008)

The Best of Shaggy is the third compilation album released by Jamaican singer Shaggy. The album was released through joint agreement between EMI and Virgin Records, on August 4, 2008. It includes material from his first four albums, as well as his collaboration with Maxi Priest, from Priest's album Man with the Fun. As Shaggy's later releases were under a different record label, EMI and Virgin did not hold the right to release tracks from them.

== Track listing ==
1. "Boombastic" (album version) – 4:10 (from Boombastic)
2. "In the Summertime" (featuring Rayvon) – 3:58 (from Boombastic)
3. "Oh Carolina" – 3:10 (from Pure Pleasure)
4. "That Girl" (with Maxi Priest) – 4:01 (from Man with the Fun)
5. "Piece of My Heart" (featuring Marsha Morrison) – 4:17 (from Midnite Lover)
6. "Sexy Body Girls" – 3:50 (from Midnite Lover)
7. "Why You Treat Me So Bad" (featuring Grand Puba) – 3:49 (from Boombastic)
8. "Big Up" (featuring Rayvon) – 3:27 (from Pure Pleasure)
9. "Soon Be Done" – 4:02 (from Pure Pleasure)
10. "Woman a Pressure Me" – 3:33 (from Boombastic)
11. "The Train Is Coming" (featuring Ken Boothe) – 3:43 (from Boombastic)
12. "Geenie" (featuring Brian and Tony Gold) – 3:59 (from Midnite Lover)
