= Best of Shaggy: The Boombastic Collection =

Greatest hits album by Shaggy
- Released: August 25, 2008
- Genre: Reggae fusion, dancehall
- Length: 74:58
- Label: Geffen
- Producer: O. Burell

Shaggy chronology
The Best of Shaggy (2008)	Best of Shaggy: The Boombastic Collection (2008)	Shaggy & Friends (2011)

Best of Shaggy: The Boombastic Collection is the fourth compilation album released by Jamaican singer Shaggy. The album was released in the United Kingdom on August 25, 2008. It reached number 22 on the UK Albums Chart. The album features material from all eight of Shaggy's previous studio albums, making it his only compilation to include material from post-Hot Shot.

== Track listing ==
1. "Boombastic" – 4:07 (from Boombastic)
2. "Strength of a Woman" – 3:50 (from Lucky Day)
3. "Angel" (featuring Rayvon) – 3:55 (from Hot Shot)
4. "Hey Sexy Lady" (featuring Brian and Tony Gold) – 3:21 (from Lucky Day)
5. "Feel the Rush" (featuring Trix & Flix) – 3:05 (from Intoxication)
6. "Those Days" (featuring Na'sha) – 3:23 (from Intoxication)
7. "Don't Ask Her That" (featuring Nicole Scherzinger) – 4:25 (from Clothes Drop)
8. "It Wasn't Me" (featuring Ricardo 'RikRok' Ducent) – 3:48 (from Hot Shot)
9. "Hope" (featuring Prince Mydas) – 3:47 (from Hot Shot)
10. "In the Summertime" (featuring Rayvon) – 3:45 (from Boombastic)
11. "Luv Me, Luv Me" (featuring Samantha Cole) – 3:33 (from Hot Shot)
12. "Oh Carolina" – 3:05 (from Pure Pleasure)
13. "Ready fi di Ride" – 3:35 (from Clothes Drop)
14. "Church Heathen" – 4:06 (from Intoxication)
15. "Leave It to Me" (featuring Brian and Tony Gold) – 3:37 (from Hot Shot)
16. "Would You Be" (featuring Brian Thompson) – 4:16 (from Clothes Drop)
17. "Wild 2nite" (featuring Olivia) – 3:30 (from Clothes Drop)
18. "Gone with Angels" – 4:05 (from Clothes Drop)
19. "Me Julie" – 3:45 (iTunes exclusive bonus track; from Ali G Indahouse – Da Soundtrack)

== Charts ==
Chart performance for Best of Shaggy: The Boombastic Collection
Chart (2008)	Peak position
Austrian Albums (Ö3 Austria)	30
Belgian Albums (Ultratop Flanders)	50
Swiss Albums (Schweizer Hitparade)	81
UK Albums (OCC)	22

== Certifications ==
Certifications for Best of Shaggy: The Boombastic Collection
Region	Certification	Certified units/sales
United Kingdom (BPI)	Gold	100,000^{‡}
^{‡} Sales+streaming figures based on certification alone.
