= Shaun Pizzonia =

American record producer (born 1968)

- Also known as: Sting International
- Origin: New York City, U.S.
- Genres: Reggae fusion; dancehall; soca
- Occupations: Record producer; disc jockey; audio engineer
- Instruments: Keyboards; guitar; bass; drums; percussion
- Years active: 1986–present
- Labels: Ranch Entertainment; Big Yard

Shaun Pizzonia (born March 9, 1968), better known by his stage name Sting International, is an American record producer, DJ, sound engineer. He best known for his work with Jamaican musician Shaggy, having produced his hit songs "It Wasn't Me" and "Angel", as well as English musician Sting (no relation).

Pizzonia was well known for his knowledge across numerous genres, and is one of the most in-demand radio and club DJs. He has been influential in broadening dancehall reggae's audience. The name "Sting International" is based on an acronym of four DJ names: Shaun, Tony, Ian and Gary. "I threw an N in there and got STING, and I added International to it because it sounded f**king grand and everybody loved it."

In 1996, Pizzonia founded Big Yard Records with Robert Livingston and Shaggy. After departing Big Yard in 2011, Pizzonia formed the record label Ranch Entertainment Inc (REI) with Shaggy, Paul Rossi, and Yoichi Imai, and Pizzonia is the label's chief producer.

== Selected works ==
- "Oh Carolina" single (1993) – producer
- "Big Up" single (1993) – producer, co-writer
- Boombastic album (1995) – producer, arranger, performer, co-writer
- "It Wasn't Me" single (2000) – producer, co-writer
- "Angel" single (2000) – producer
- Clothes Drop album (2005) – co-writer
- Intoxication album (2007) – producer, co-writer
- "Everything You Need" track (2011) – performer
- Summer in Kingston album (2011) – producer, co-writer
- Rise album (2012) – co-writer
- 44/876 album (2018) – producer, co-writer

== Awards and nominations ==
Grammy Awards

Year	Nominated work	Award	Result
1996	Boombastic	Best Reggae Album	Won
2002	"It Wasn't Me" featuring Rikrok	Best Pop Collaboration with Vocal	Nominated
2006	Clothes Drop	Best Reggae Album	Nominated
2008	Intoxication	Best Reggae Album	Nominated
2012	Summer in Kingston	Best Reggae Album	Nominated
2019	44/876	Best Reggae Album	Won
