= Pallaso =

Ugandan musician (born 1987)

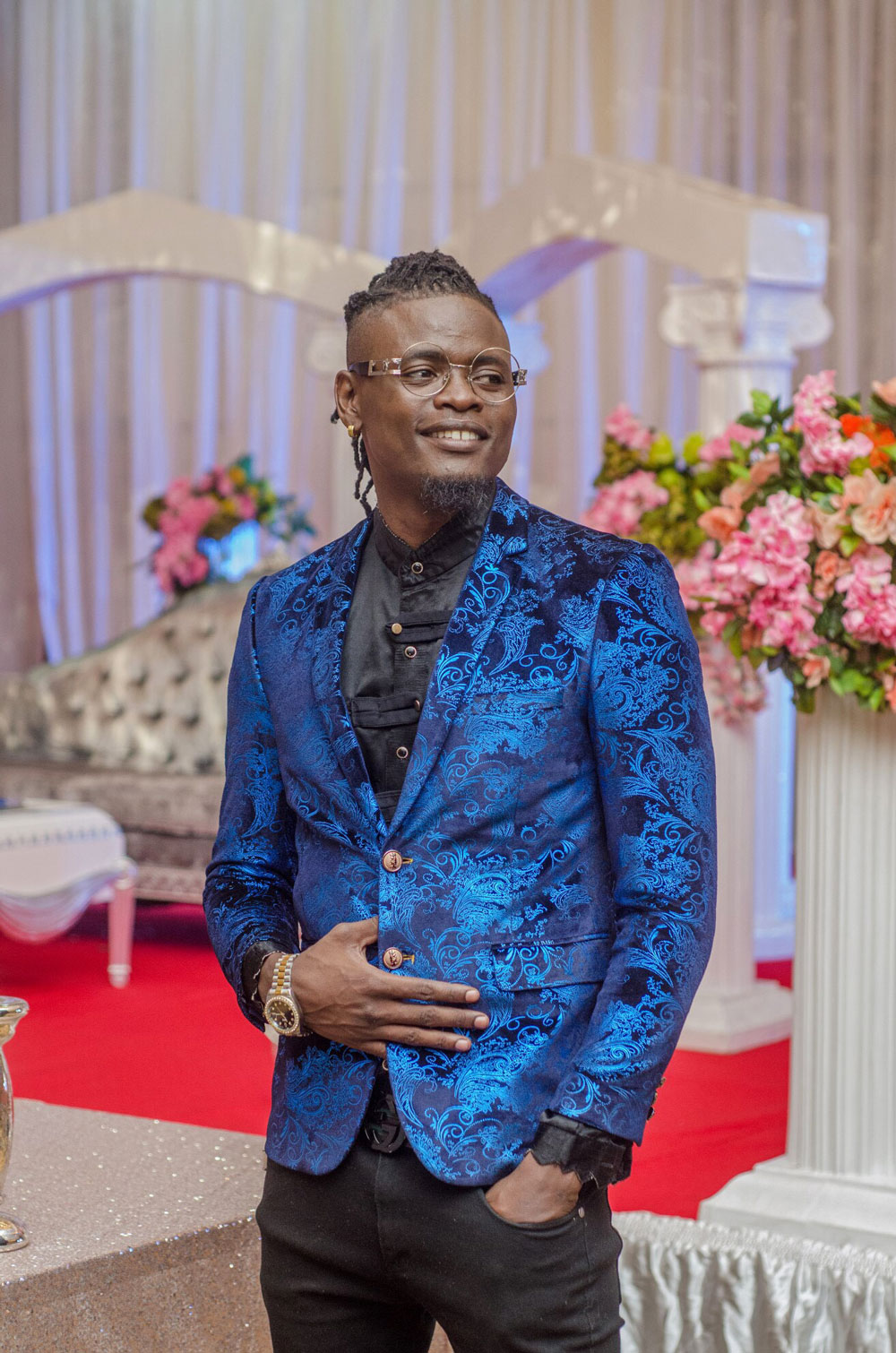
- Born: Pius Mayanja; 5 September 1987 (age 39); Kawempe, Kampala, Uganda
- Other name: Lizard, King of the East, Sucker free boss
- Occupations: Singer; songwriter; record producer; Stylist
- Relatives: Jose Chameleone (Brother); Akay 47 (Brother); Weasel (Brother); Humphrey Mayanja (Brother)
- Musical career
- Genres: R&B; Afro pop; Hip hop; Dancehall; Afrobeats; Kidandali
- Label: Team Good Music
- Website: pallasomusic.com

Pius Mayanja (born 5 September 1987) known by his stage name Pallaso is a Ugandan recording artist, songwriter, producer and videographer. His music genre specialty is Afrobeats, Hip hop, Dancehall, Afropop, and RnB.

His musical journey started back in 2000 when he started out at Leone Island, a musical group owned by his older brother, Dr. Jose Chameleone. He later moved to the US, where he lived for 10 years before returning to Uganda in 2014. Upon his return, he set out to establish his now very celebrated musical career, and formed the group, Team Good Music which seems to be working well in the Uganda Music Industry.

== Early life ==
Pallaso was born on 5 September 1987 at Mulago Hospital to Mr. Gerald Mayanja and Ms. Prossy Mayanja. He is one of seven children born to the couple. The family spent most of their early years in Kawempe, a suburb in Kampala. Pallaso comes from a musical family with three of his brothers (Jose Chameleone, Weasel and the late AK47 Mayanja) running reputable musical careers in Uganda. His son named nesta vibez who is alro a musician in uganda.

== Music career ==
Pallaso begun his musical career under the musical group, Leone Island, and went under the stage name, Lizard. His first single was Mudigidde in 2003 which was produced by his brother Dr. Jose Chameleone. The song had massive airplay and crowd reception, having been played first on Radio Simba by Bobo King and Omulangira Ndawusi.

In 2004 Pallaso left Uganda and started working in United States where he also continued with his music career. While in America, he re-branded himself from Lizard to Pallaso from his real name Pius. While residing in Lewiston, Maine, he collaborated with a local rapper known as The Mess. Together they collaborated on a joint album titled Change released in 2013.

In 2014, Pallaso teamed with Shaggy and DJ Hidrro and they released the song Remain in Our Hearts which was dedicated to the fallen heroes mainly Michael Jackson, Bob Marley and The Notorious B.I.G.

Later that year Pallaso returned to Uganda and begun his musical journey with a collabo with Goodlyfe Crew titled Amaaso.The song became a chart topper and was featured on various TV and Radio musical charts for several weeks. Pallaso later worked on several solo musical projects including Wekoledewo kaki, Omugongo and many others.

He then teamed up with Ugandan artiste, Sheebah Karungi and begun the musical group, Team No Sleep, with prominent musical manager, Jeff Kiwa coming on board as the group's manager. The Team No Sleep group would later be joined by the likes of King Saha, Ak47 and other rising musicians.

Together with Sheebah, the duo released their first single Mundongo, followed by Go Down Low which won the HiPipo Music Awards as Best Afro Pop Song 2015. Pallaso later co-produced the single Tamale Mirundi with King Saha and several other singles which include Kilabe embaliga and Sanyu lyange, which was a remake of a classic by another Ugandan artiste, Sweet Kid.

In November 2014, he started working on a collaboration with the Nigerian musician Davido for the single Twatoba, which was released in January 2015. He released it alongside his other 2015 songs which include Ffe tuliko, Tiwa Savage, Mubambazanga, Tebakusobolola and many others. On 19 May 2015, Pallaso left Team No Sleep to form his independent group, Team Good Music.

== Personal life ==
He is a young brother to Jose Chameleone. Pallaso is a father to two children, a girl named Maisha Mayanja and a boy named Dinari Mayanja He was on a police hunt for having fled from them with handcuffs on after he was arrested for not abiding by the COVID-19 social distancing rules.

Pallaso was attacked by an angry mob in Johannesburg, South Africa. He was reportedly hit with stones and cut with pangas. He had gone there to shoot a new video for one of his songs.

== Awards ==
Award name	Status	Year
HiPipo Awards- Best Artiste in the Diaspora	Won	2014
Buzz Teeniez Awards –Flyest Music Video (Amaaso)	Won	
Buzz Teeniez Awards-Hottest Riddim	Won	
Buzz Teeniez Awards-Teeniez hottest collaboration (Amaaso)	Won	
Rising Star Awards- Best Male Artiste	Won	2014
HiPpio Awards- Best Male Artiste	Nominated	2015
HiHipo Awards-Best Collaboration	Won	
Zinna Awards-Male Artiste of the Year	Nominated	2015
Zzina Awards- Best Collaboration	Nominated	2015
Zzina Awards-Inspirational Song of the Year (Mama)	Won	2016
Zinna Awards- inspirational Song of the Year (Soma)	Won	2016
Zinna Awards- Inspirational Song of the Year (Soma)	Won	
MTV Africa Music Awards - Listener's Choice	Nominated	2021
Janzi Awards - Male Artist of the Year	Won	2021
Zzina Awards – Artist of the Year	Won	2021
Zzina Awards – Song of the Year	Won	2021
Zzina Awards – Best Male Artist of the Year	Won	2021
Zzina Awards – Artist of the Year	Won	2022
Zzina Awards – Best Male Artist of the Year	Won	2022
MTN Awards – People’s Choice Award Male	Won	2022

== Discography ==
=== Live ===
- Pallaso Live Club Beats Online Concert (21 December 2020)

=== Album ===
- Mama (August 28, 2016)

=== Singles ===
- Move Your Body (14 April 2013)
- Change (with The Mess) (17 May 2013)
- No More (with Dirty Boy Raw) (23 May 2013)
- It's Cold – (Tribute to Ayla Reynolds (3 September 2013)
- Follow Me (with The Mess) (26 September 2013)
- Amaaso (Radio & Weasel feat. Pallaso & The Mess) (23 October 2013)
- Home (with The Mess) (21 December 2013)
- Mundongo (with Sheebah) (28 March 2014)
- Wekoledewo Kaki (13 June 2014)
- Go Down Low (with Sheebah) (12 August 2014)
- Pray For Me (7 October 2014)
- Tamale (with King Saha) (16 September 2014)
- Ntwala (with Spilla) (17 October 2014)
- Sanyu Lyange (13 November 2014)
- Very Sorry (4 December 2014)
- Twatoba (feat. Davido) (25 February 2015)
- Koona (feat. Spice Diana) (14 June 2015)
- Malamu (2020)
- Ani Oyo (2020)
- Nalonda Nemala (2021)
- Mpa Love (2021)
- Bega Bega (2022)

Others

- Mudigidde
- Omugongo
- Nyola
- Tebakusobola
- Mubambazanga
- AKOLO
- Tiwa Savage
- Ffe Tuliko
- Nze Ani
- Sweet Love
- Sipiyo
- Onfitinya
- Kirabe embaliga
- Yes We Can
- My Gurly Gurly
- Move Ya Body
- African Tears
- No Answers
- Birthday
- Ready For You
- Never Came Clean
- My Girl
- Believe in Me
- Omusawo
- Ndikuwaki (2021)
- Bareke Abo (2022)
- Katonda (2022)
- Sherry (2022)
- Zari (2022)

== See also ==
- List of Ugandan artists
