= Nice and Lovely =

1993 single by Shaggy

Single by Shaggy

from the album Pure Pleasure
- B-side: "'Fraid to Ask"
- Released: 25 June 1993
- Recorded: 1993
- Genre: Reggae
- Length: 3:28
- Label: Virgin; Greensleeves
- Songwriter(s): Orville Burrell; Bruce Brewster; Shaun Pizzonia
- Producer(s): Sting International

Shaggy singles chronology
"Oh Carolina" (1993)	"Nice and Lovely" (1993)	"Soon Be Done" (1993)

"Nice and Lovely" is a song by Jamaican reggae artist Shaggy, released as the second single from his debut studio album, Pure Pleasure (1993). The song was released on 25 June 1993 by Virgin and Greensleeves Records, following the success of his debut single, "Oh Carolina". It was considered much of a step away from the simplicity of the first single, and as such, the release was surrounded by controversy. "Nice and Lovely" was only released in the United Kingdom, however, promotional copies of the single were issued in the United States. It peaked at No. 46 on the UK Singles Chart, forty-five places lower than "Oh Carolina".

== Critical reception ==
Larry Flick from Billboard magazine wrote, "Now here's a record with a hip and intriguing twist. Pop-minded toaster Shaggy teams with soul singer Rayon for a finger-poppin' jam that combines island flavors with swing-style blues. Highly unusual and contagious track has been remixed to attract more traditional reggae and hip-hop interest. Kudos for an adventurous and totally refreshing effort." Charles Aaron from Spin commented, "Fantasy film noir dancehall reggae, with our heroes playing it real cool, ducking in and out of doorways, flashing nickel-plated style. Talking the sweetest smelling trash this side of Front Street, Shaggy rhymes "chocolate fudge" with "lipstick smudge". And his Brooklyn production team, Sting International, is hilariously talented."

== Music video ==
The accompanying music video for the song premiered in May 1993, and in 2009, was made available via Shaggy's official Vevo account. It features Shaggy performing the song in an underground setting.

== Track listing ==
United Kingdom

- CD single
1. "Nice and Lovely" (Radio Edit) – 3:28
2. "Nice and Lovely" (Moore R&B Mix) – 4:21
3. "Oh Carolina" (Konders Flatbush Mix) – 3:04
4. "'Fraid to Ask" – 3:15
- Cassette
1. "Nice and Lovely" (Radio Edit) – 3:28
2. "Nice and Lovely" (Moore R&B Mix) – 4:21
- 12" vinyl
1. "Nice and Lovely" (Original Mix) – 3:43
2. "Nice and Lovely" (Moore R&B Mix) – 4:21
3. "Nice and Lovely" (Livingstone Ragga Mix) – 3:55
4. "Oh Carolina" (Konders Flatbush Mix) – 3:04
- 12" vinyl – Promotional
1. "Nice and Lovely" (Original Mix) – 3:43
2. "Nice and Lovely" (Moore R&B Mix) – 4:21
3. "Nice and Lovely" (Livingstone Ragga Mix) – 3:55
4. "Oh Carolina" (Konders Flatbush Mix) – 3:04
5. "Oh Carolina" (Break Beats)
6. "'Fraid to Ask" (Livingsting Remix)

United States

- CD single
1. "Nice and Lovely" (Radio Edit) – 3:28
2. "Nice and Lovely" (Moore R&B Mix) – 4:21
3. "Nice and Lovely" (Frankie's Hip Hop Mix) – 4:35
4. "Nice and Lovely" (Horn Mix) – 3:54
5. "Victoria's Secret" – 4:09
- 7" vinyl
1. "Nice and Lovely" (Radio Edit) – 3:28
2. "Victoria's Secret" – 4:09
- 12" vinyl
1. "Nice and Lovely" (Radio Edit) – 3:28
2. "Nice and Lovely" (Ram Mix) – 3:54
3. "Nice and Lovely" (12" Dub) – 4:01
4. "Nice and Lovely" (Moore R&B Mix) – 4:21
5. "Nice and Lovely" (Frankie's Hip Hop Mix) – 4:35
6. "Victoria's Secret" – 4:09

== Chart positions ==
Chart (1993)	Peak position
UK Singles (OCC)	46
