= Soon Be Done =

1993 single by Shaggy

Single by Shaggy

from the album Pure Pleasure
- B-side: "Ah-E-A-Oh"
- Released: 28 June 1993
- Genre: Reggae
- Length: 3:37
- Label: Virgin; Greensleeves
- Songwriters: Orville Burrell; Robert Livingston
- Producer: Sting International

Shaggy singles chronology
"Nice and Lovely" (1993)	"Soon Be Done" (1993)	"Big Up" (1993)

"Soon Be Done" is a song by Jamaican reggae artist Shaggy, released in June 1993 by Virgin and Greensleeves Records as the third single from the artist's first studio album, Pure Pleasure (1993). The song spent three weeks in the UK Top 100 Singles Chart peaking at #46. It was only released in the United Kingdom and Europe.

== Critical reception ==
Alan Jones from Music Week gave the song four out of five and named it Pick of the Week, adding, "More traditional fare from Shaggy, whose gruff patois is anchored to an understated rhythm track. Less of a killer than "Oh Carolina", but another substantial, good humoured hit." Dele Fadele from NME wrote, "The lecherous and leering twist in Shaggy's voice is still present and correct as he turns his mind to matters sexual. Again. Ghostly, multi-layered harmonies percolate over a rhythm that's closer to digital excavations of Studio One than minimalistic, abrupt raggamuffin beats." Sylvia Patterson of Smash Hits was less enthustiastic, rating it two out of five and calling it a "daft ragga nursery rhyme".

== Music video ==
A music video for the song was premiered in September 1993 and, in 2009, was made available via Shaggy's official VEVO account. The video shows Shaggy performing the song in an underground setting.

== Track listings ==
- CD, cassette, and 7-inch vinyl
1. "Soon Be Done" - 3:37
2. "Soon Be Done" (Champion Mix) - 3:43
- Maxi-CD
1. "Soon Be Done" - 3:37
2. "Soon Be Done" (Dancehall Lick) - 6:05
3. "Soon Be Done" (Champion Mix) - 3:43
4. "Ah-E-A-Oh" (featuring Sylva) – 3:15
- 12-inch vinyl
1. "Soon Be Done" - 3:37
2. "Soon Be Done" (Dancehall Lick) - 6:05
3. "Ah-E-A-Oh" (featuring Sylva) – 3:15
4. "Ah-E-A-Oh" (featuring Sylva) (Alternate Version)

== Charts ==
=== Weekly charts ===
Chart (1993)	Peak position
Netherlands (Dutch Top 40 Tipparade)	12
New Zealand (Recorded Music NZ)	9
UK Singles (OCC)	39
UK Airplay (ERA)	94
UK Dance (Music Week)	29
UK Club Chart (Music Week)	47

=== Year-end charts ===
Chart (1993)	Position
New Zealand (Recorded Music NZ)	39

== Certifications ==
Region	Certification	Certified units/sales
New Zealand (RMNZ)	Gold	5,000^{*}
^{*} Sales figures based on certification alone.
