= Lottery (Shaggy album) =

Studio album by Shaggy
- Released: May 15, 2026
- Recorded: 2025-2026
- Genres: Reggae, dancehall, reggae-pop
- Length: 40:11
- Labels: VP, Ranch Entertainment
- Producers: Orville Burrell, Shane Hoosong, Karl Daniel, Fairfax Robert, Nyann Lodge, Aliandro Prawl, Constantin Ionita, Lloyd James Jr.

Shaggy chronology
Com Fly Wid Mi (2022)	Lottery (2026)

Singles from Lottery
- 1. "Til A Mawnin (feat. Sting)" Released: February 27, 2025; 2. "Boom Body (feat. Akon & Aidonia)" Released: November 14, 2025; 3. "Dancehall Nice (feat. Beres Hammond & Dexta Daps)" Released: February 27, 2026; 4. "Looking Lovely (feat. Robin Thicke)" Released: March 15, 2026; 5. "Lottery (feat. Jeremih)" Released: May 15, 2026

Lottery is the seventeenth studio album by Jamaican dancehall artist Shaggy, released on May 15, 2026, through VP Records and Ranch Entertainment. The album contains 13 tracks and features collaborations with Sting, Robin Thicke, Anthony Hamilton, Akon, Jeremih, Beres Hammond, Dexta Daps, Aidonia, 450, Mutabaruka, Vanessa Amorosi, Noah Powa, Olaf Blackwood and Rayvon. In the album, Lottery combines reggae, dancehall and pop with elements of hip-hop, soul and R&B.

== Background ==
Shaggy explained that the album's title how he sees the music industry as a lottery, where there is no clear path to success and artists need to bet on themselves. He also described the album as the best of him at this stage of his life.

Shaggy said that he started working on Lottery about eight years earlier but was repeatedly interrupted by other projects. Regarding the collaborations, he didn't feel like he had to go out and get collaborators, so he just called on his friends to help him out.

Sting appears on two tracks, "Ain't No Sunshine," a reggae version of Bill Withers’ song, and "Til A Mawnin," a tribute to Jamaican dancehall producer Henry "Junjo" Lawes. Shaggy said that the idea for "Ain't No Sunshine" came from singing the song with Sting during soundcheck on their 2019 tour. After Shaggy sent Sting a demo, Sting added harmonies to the track. "Looking Lovely," featuring Robin Thicke, was inspired by Bill Withers' music.

"Bun (She Loves Me)" was inspired by an interview with dancehall artist Major Mackerel about infidelity. Shaggy said the interview inspired the song because it was funny and emotional.

"God Is Amazing," featuring Vanessa Amorosi and Mutabaruka, was the last track added to the album. Shaggy said he was interested in Amorosi's voice after seeing her performance at Night of the Proms in 2024.

== Promotion and release ==
"Boom Body," featuring Akon and Aidonia, was released before Lottery as a preview of the album. Shaggy said he worked on the song while he was writing music in Romania. He thought the melody would suit Akon, who later recorded his vocals in Miami.

The song debuted at number 36 on the US Billboard Rhythmic Airplay chart in January 2026 and reached a peak of number 28 on the chart in February 2026. It was Shaggy's 12th entry on the chart and Aidonia's first.

== Critical reception ==
World Music Views praised the album's production and songwriting. The album's songs were crafted with catalogue value, message and identity in mind.

Reggae Vibes praised Shaggy's ability to move between genres, generations and audiences while staying true to his roots in reggae and dancehall on this album.

== Track listing ==
Lottery track listing
No.	Title	Writer(s)	Producer(s)	Length
1.	"God Is Amazing" (featuring Mutabaruka, Vanessa Amorosi)	Orville Burrell, Jeremy Phillip Felton, Ashante Reid, Karl Daniel	Shaggy, Fairfax Robert, Aliandro Prawl	3:01
2.	"Lottery" (featuring Jeremih)	Orville Burrell, Jeremy Phillip Felton, Ashante Reid, Karl Daniel	Shaggy, Karl Daniel	2:47
3.	"Boom Body" (featuring Aidonia, Akon)	Orville Burrell, Akon, Olaf Blackwood, Silviu-Aurelian Dimitriu, Constantin Ionita, Sheldon Lawrence	Shaggy, Constantin Ionita	3:05
4.	"Looking Lovely" (featuring Robin Thicke)	Orville Burrell, Karl Daniel, Shane Hoosong, Dave Kelly, Skip Scarborough, Robin Thicke, Bill Withers	Shaggy, Karl Daniel	3:22
5.	"Bun (She Loves Me)"	Orville Burrell, Shane Hoosong	Shaggy, Shane Hoosong	3:50
6.	"Dancehall Nice" (featuring Beres Hammond, Dexta Daps)	Orville Burrell, Andre Dennis, Louis Grandison, Beres Hammond, Shane Hoosong, Lloyd James Jr., Ashante Reid	Shaggy, Lloyd James Jr., Shane Hoosong	2:34
7.	"I Gotta Work"	Orville Burrell, Shane Hoosong, Ashante Reid	Shaggy, Shane Hoosong	3:05
8.	"Ain't No Sunshine" (featuring Sting)	Bill Withers	Shaggy, Shane Hoosong	2:19
9.	"We Love Di Gal Dem" (featuring 450)	Orville Burrell, Karl Daniel, Tristan Escoffery, Ashante Reid	Shaggy, Karl Daniel	2:26
10.	"I'm Good" (featuring Anthony Hamilton)	Orville Burrell, Anthony Hamilton, Shane Hoosong	Shaggy, Shane Hoosong	3:18
11.	"Sip By Sip" (featuring Noah Powa, Olaf Blackwood)	Orville Burrell, Olaf Blackwood, Nohard Grant, Shane Hoosong, Nyann Lodge, Andrew Marsh	Nyann Lodge, Shane Hoosong	2:53
12.	"In The Name of Love" (featuring Rayvon)	Orville Burrell, Alexander Brewster, Karl Daniel	Shaggy, Karl Daniel	4:04
13.	"Til A Mawnin" (featuring Sting)	Orville Burrell, Shane Hoosong, Henry Lawes, Ashante Reid, Gordon Sumner	Shaggy, Shane Hoosong	3:27
Total length:				40:11
