= 44/876 =

Studio album by Sting and Shaggy
- Released: 20 April 2018
- Studio: Ranch Studios; Sear Sound, New York City
- Genre: Reggae
- Length: 42:52
- Label: A&M; Interscope; Cherrytree
- Producer: Sting International; Martin Kierszenbaum; Dwayne "iLL Wayno" Shippy; Teflon; Shane Hoosong; Sting; Machine Gun Funk

Sting chronology
Live at the Olympia Paris (2017)	44/876 (2018)	My Songs (2019)

Shaggy chronology
SMIX - Mr. Lover Collection (2014)	44/876 (2018)	Wah Gwaan?! (2019)

Singles from 44/876
- 1. "Don't Make Me Wait" Released: 26 January 2018; 2. "Gotta Get Back My Baby" Released: 28 September 2018; 3. "Just One Lifetime" Released: 1 March 2019

Professional ratings
Aggregate scores
Source	Rating
Metacritic	49/100
Review scores
Source	Rating
AllMusic	3/5 stars
The A.V. Club	D
The Guardian	2/5 stars
Mojo	3/5 stars
NME	2/5 stars
Pitchfork	4.8/10
Q	3/5 stars
Rolling Stone	2.5/5 stars
The Telegraph	4/5 stars
Uncut	4/10

44/876 is a collaborative album by English musician Sting and Jamaican musician Shaggy. It was released on 20 April 2018 by A&M Records, Interscope Records and Cherrytree Records.

The album's title refers to the country calling code for the United Kingdom (+44) and the North American area code for Jamaica (876), Sting's and Shaggy's respective home countries.

On 7 December 2018 the Deluxe Softpack 8-bonus-track CD edition of the album was released including the unreleased track "Skank Up (Oh Lawd)", two new versions of "Gotta Get Back My Baby" and five unreleased acoustic live tracks recorded in July 2018 in Paris.

The album won an award for Best Reggae Album at the 61st Grammy Awards in February 2019.

== Commercial performance ==
In the United Kingdom, 44/876 debuted at number nine on the UK Albums Chart with first-week sales of 7,658 units. It is Sting's first top 10-album since Sacred Love (2003), and Shaggy's first since Hot Shot (2000).

"Don't Make Me Wait" was also included in Sting's Duets album in 2021.

== Track listing ==
Standard edition
No.	Title	Writer(s)	Producer(s)	Length
1.	"44/876" (featuring Morgan Heritage and Aidonia)	Sting; Orville Burrell; Rohan Rankine; Sheldon Lawrence; Shaun Pizzonia; Dwayne Shippy; Martin Kierszenbaum	Sting International; Dwayne "iLL Wayno" Shippy	2:59
2.	"Morning Is Coming"	Sting; Burrell; Rankine; Pizzonia	Sting International	3:11
3.	"Waiting for the Break of Day"	Sting; Burrell; Pizzonia; Shippy	Sting International	3:18
4.	"Gotta Get Back My Baby"	Sting; Burrell; Andre Fennell; Sheldon M. Harris; Kierszenbaum	Teflon; Kierszenbaum	2:56
5.	"Don't Make Me Wait"	Sting; Burrell; Ashante Reid; Pizzonia; Kameron Quintin Jones; Kennard Garrett	Sting International	3:35
6.	"Just One Lifetime"	Sting; Burrell; Rankine; Pizzonia; Shane Hoosong	Sting International; Hoosong	3:30
7.	"22nd Street"	Sting; Burrell; Rankine; Pizzonia; Andy Bassford	Sting International	4:00
8.	"Dreaming in the U.S.A."	Sting; Burrell; Rankine; Dominic Miller; Kierszenbaum	Sting; Kierszenbaum	3:08
9.	"Crooked Tree"	Sting; Kierszenbaum; Burrell; Pizzonia; Shippy; Hoosong	Sting International	3:37
10.	"To Love and Be Loved"	Sting; Burrell; Rankine; Pizzonia; Daudi Henderson	Sting International; Machine Gun Funk	3:29
11.	"Sad Trombone"	Sting; Burrell; Pizzonia; Shippy	Sting International	5:43
12.	"Night Shift"	Sting; Eliot Sumner; Burrell; Reid; Miller; Kierszenbaum	Sting International; Kierszenbaum	3:26
Total length:				42:52

Digital Deluxe and Target Exclusive editions (bonus tracks)
No.	Title	Writer(s)	Producer(s)	Length
13.	"If You Can't Find Love"	Sting; Burrell; Pizzonia; Rankine; Bassford; Karl Wright; Joshua Thomas; Shippy; Miller; Kierszenbaum	Sting International; Kierszenbaum	3:34
14.	"Love Changes Everything"	Andrew Lloyd Webber; Charles Elliott Hart; Don Black	Sting International	3:52
15.	"16 Fathoms"	Sting; Burrell; Rankine; Kierszenbaum	Kierszenbaum	3:19
16.	"Don't Make Me Wait" (Dave Audé Rhythmic Radio Remix)	Sting; Burrell; Reid; Pizzonia; Jones; Garrett	Sting International; Dave Audé; Jason Robinson	3:47
Total length:				57:27

Super Deluxe Edition (bonus disc) — Live at Shaggy & Friends, Kingston, Jamaica
No.	Title	Length
1.	"Englishman in New York" (Sting)
2.	"Fields of Gold" (Sting)
3.	"Message in a Bottle" (Sting featuring Agent Sasco)
4.	"Don't Make Me Wait" (Sting and Shaggy)
5.	"Roxanne" (Sting and Shaggy)
6.	"Cherrytree Radio Interview with Sting and Shaggy"

CD Deluxe Softpack Edition (bonus tracks)
No.	Title	Length
13.	"Gotta Get Back My Baby" (new version)
14.	"Skank Up (Oh Lawd)" (unreleased track)
15.	"Gotta Get Back My Baby" (DJ Dave Audé remix)
16.	"If You Can't Find Love" (acoustic live, Paris, July 2018)
17.	"Message in a Bottle" (acoustic live, Paris, July 2018)
18.	"Every Breath You Take" (acoustic live, Paris, July 2018)
19.	"Don't Make Me Wait" (acoustic live, Paris, July 2018)
20.	"Fields of Gold" (acoustic live, Paris, July 2018)

== Personnel ==
- Shaggy – vocals
- Sting – bass guitar, producer, backing vocals
- Aidonia – lead vocals (1)
- Morgan Heritage – backing vocals (1)
- David TV Barnes – horn section leader, horn arranger
- Andy Bassford – guitar
- Maggie Buckley – flute, saxophone
- Kameron Corvet – guitar, producer
- Shaun Darson – drum fills
- Robert Dubwise – guitar
- Dwayne Shippy – additional production, bass, guitar, instrumentation, keyboards, percussion, producer, sounds, string arrangements, backing vocals
- Kennard Garrett – producer
- Clark Gayton – mastering, trombone
- Joel Gonzalez – horn
- Gene Grimaldi – mastering
- Shane Hoosong – additional production, drums, keyboards, percussion, producer, sounds
- Zach Jones – drums, backing vocals
- Geoffrey Keezer – piano
- Heather Kierszenbaum – sounds
- Martin Kierszenbaum – additional production, back cover photo, bass, clavichord, drums, editing, executive producer, Fender Rhodes, guitar, keyboards, organ, percussion, piano, producer, sounds, synthesizer
- Tony Lake – engineer
- Zachary Lucas – horn
- Machine Gun Funk – drums, keyboards, producer
- Branford Marsalis – saxophone
- Steven "Lenky" Marsden – keyboards
- Kamari Martin – backing vocals
- Dominic Miller – guitar
- Melissa Musique – backing vocals
- Gene Noble – backing vocals
- Salvador Ochoa – cover photo
- Robert Orton – engineer, mixing, percussion, synthesizer
- Danny Quatrochi – guitar technician
- Dave Richards – bass
- Glenn Rogers – guitar
- Robbie Shakespeare – bass guitar
- Shaun "Sting International" Pizzonia – bas dessus, bass guitar, drums, editing, engineer, guitar, instrumentation, keyboards, mixing, percussion, producer, sounds, backing vocals
- Robert Stringer – horn
- Eliot Sumner – vocals
- Teflon – drums, keyboards, producer
- Grant Valentine – assistant engineer
- Nicole VanGiesen – photography
- Liam Ward – art direction, design
- Karl Wright – drums
- Joan Campbell – actor

== Charts ==
=== Weekly charts ===
Chart (2018)	Peak position
Australian Albums (ARIA)	38
Austrian Albums (Ö3 Austria)	6
Belgian Albums (Ultratop Flanders)	22
Belgian Albums (Ultratop Wallonia)	4
Czech Albums (ČNS IFPI)	11
Dutch Albums (Album Top 100)	16
French Albums (SNEP)	2
German Albums (Offizielle Top 100)	1
Hungarian Albums (MAHASZ)	27
Italian Albums (FIMI)	13
Polish Albums (ZPAV)	3
Portuguese Albums (AFP)	19
Scottish Albums (Official Charts)	9
Slovak Albums (ČNS IFPI)	26
Spanish Albums (Promusicae)	35
Swiss Albums (Schweizer Hitparade)	5
UK Albums (Official Charts)	9
US Billboard 200	40

=== Year-end charts ===
Chart (2018)	Position
Belgian Albums (Ultratop Wallonia)	119
French Albums (SNEP)	104
German Albums (Offizielle Top 100)	66
Swiss Albums (Schweizer Hitparade)	99

Chart (2019)	Position
French Albums (SNEP)	163

== Certifications ==
Region	Certification	Certified units/sales
France (SNEP)	Gold	50,000^{‡}
Poland (ZPAV)	Gold	10,000^{‡}
^{‡} Sales+streaming figures based on certification alone.
