= Alexander Stewart (singer) =

Canadian singer, songwriter and YouTuber (born 1999)

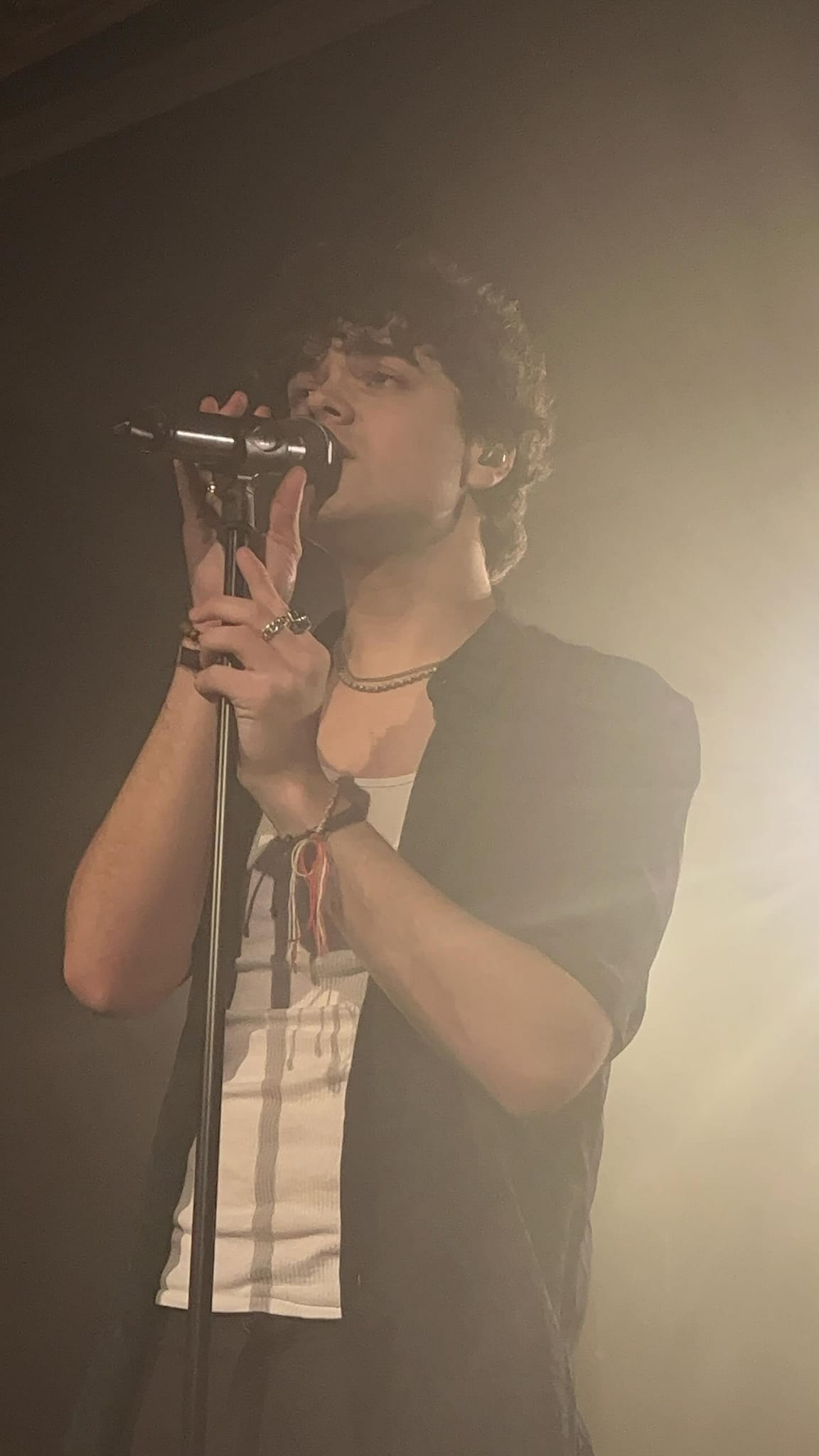

Background information
- Born: August 27, 1999 (age 27); Toronto, Ontario, Canada
- Genre: Pop
- Occupations: Singer, songwriter
- Years active: 2018–present
- Labels: Virgin; FAE grp
- Website: Facebook, YouTube

Alexander Stewart (born August 27, 1999) is a Canadian pop singer, songwriter, and social media creator known for his emotionally raw songwriting and massive online following. He rose to prominence with his singles "I Wish You Cheated" and "His Problem Instead," both of which charted on the Billboard Canadian Hot 100.

Stewart began his career as a teenager, uploading his first cover to YouTube in May 2013. His cover of Camila Cabello's "Havana" in 2017 became a breakout moment, propelling him toward original music and a growing fanbase. Born in Toronto and now based in Los Angeles, he has described his catalog as a "sonic diary" — a public record of his life and emotions dating back to age 16.

Stewart was the second-most popular artist on TikTok in Canada in 2023, and his platform presence has been a major driver of his success. His TikTok campaign for "I Wish You Cheated" amassed over 43 million views and led to a performance on The Tonight Show Starring Jimmy Fallon. Across platforms, he has accumulated over half a billion streams globally, with hundreds of millions of YouTube views.

His Juno-nominated debut studio album Bleeding Heart was released in May 2024. In November 2024, he reached number one on Billboard's Dance/Mix Show Airplay chart with "Wrong Way," a collaboration with LA-based producers Two Friends. His sophomore album, What If?, followed in October 2025, featuring singles including "Friends Don't" with Lauren Spencer Smith, and was supported by a 34-date world tour. Stewart also performed "The Way a Heart Breaks" on The Kelly Clarkson Show in October 2025 in support of the album. In 2025, Stewart signed with Virgin Music.

== Early life ==
Stewart was born August 27, 1999, in Toronto. He is the second and youngest child of Joanna and Alec Stewart. His sister's name is Elizabeth Stewart.

== Career ==
=== 2013–2018: Early days on YouTube ===
Stewart uploaded his first cover song to the YouTube channel Alec Stewart on May 24, 2013, performing "When I Was Your Man" by Bruno Mars. His first official cover on his personal YouTube channel was New York State of Mind by Billy Joel. Over several years, he continued uploading cover songs to his YouTube channel, gaining popularity from his cover of Camila Cabello's "Havana", which he uploaded on October 22, 2017. Following the song's popularity, he began writing and uploading his own songs.

=== 2019–present: Musical beginnings, Bleeding Heart, signing a record deal, What If? ===
In 2019, Stewart worked with Shaggy to release the single "You".

On September 4, 2020, Stewart released his debut EP, Backwards, leading with the titular single, "Backwards", which reached #31 on Billboard's Canada CHR/Top 40 radio chart.

In May 2024, Stewart released his debut studio album Bleeding Heart. It was preceded by the singles "Blame's on Me", "Broken by You" and the Billboard Canadian Hot 100 song "I Wish You Cheated".

In August 2024, Stewart received an MTV Video Music Award nomination for Video for Good for his song "If You Only Knew".

In November 2024, Stewart reached number one on Billboard's Dance/Mix Show Airplay chart with "Wrong Way" with L.A.-based producers Two Friends.

In February 2025, Stewart received a Juno Award nomination for Breakthrough Artist or Group of the Year, and his debut studio album Bleeding Heart was nominated for a Juno Award for Pop Album of the Year.

On June 12, 2025, Stewart announced on Instagram that he had signed a record deal with Virgin Music.

On October 24, 2025, Stewart released his sophomore album, What If?, which was preceded by singles "Blame On You", "Here Again", "Scared of Myself", and "Friends Don't" with Lauren Spencer Smith. Stewart is set to go on a 34-date tour to support the album, called the "What If? Tour", set to kick off in Manchester, United Kingdom on November 13, 2025, before coming to North America in early 2026, ending in Los Angeles, California on April 4, 2026.

== Discography ==
=== Studio albums ===
List of studio albums, showing release date, label and formats
Title	Details
Bleeding Heart	Released: May 10, 2024; Label: FAE grp; Formats: Digital download, streaming
What If?	Released: October 24, 2025; Label: Virgin; Formats: Digital download, streaming

=== Extended plays ===
List of EPs, showing release date, label and formats
Title	Details	Peak chart positions
Title	Details	UK DL
Backwards	Released: September 20, 2020; Label: AS Records; Formats: Digital download, streaming	—
Aftermath	Released: November 5, 2021; Label: Independent; Formats: Digital download, streaming	—
If You Only Knew	Released: December 8, 2023; Label: FAE grp; Formats: Digital download, streaming	92
"—" denotes a recording that did not chart.

=== Singles ===
==== As lead artist ====
List of singles as lead artist, with chart positions, certifications, year released, and album name
Title	Year	Peak chart positions	Certifications	Album/EP
Title	Year	CAN	Certifications	Album/EP
"Enamorado"	2018	—		Non-album single
"Best Damn Thing"	2018	—		Backwards
"Backwards"	2019	—		Backwards
"Shy"	2019	—		Backwards
"Shady"	2019	—		Backwards
"No Thanks"	2019	—		Backwards
"This Is Your Life"	2019	—		Non-album single
"Single"	2019	—		Backwards
"Don't Give Your Heart Away for Christmas"	2019	—		Non-album singles
"Halo"	2019	—		Non-album singles
"Compare Myself"	2020	—		Non-album singles
"Stop & Go" (with Mime)	2021	—		Non-album singles
"House of Cards"	2021	—		Aftermath
"Let Me Hate You"	2021	—		Aftermath
"24 Hours"	2021	—		Aftermath
"Different People" (with Haven)	2021	—		Non-album singles
"Echo"	2022	—		Non-album singles
"When You Love Someone"	2022	—		Non-album singles
"Back to You"	2022	—		Non-album singles
"Would You Lie" (with Seeb)	2022	—		Non-album singles
"Blame's on Me"	2022	—	MC: Gold	Bleeding Heart
"Leave Me in the Dark"	2023	—		Non-album singles
"I'm Trying"	2023	—		Non-album singles
"Birthday Cake (Duet)" (with Dylan Conrique)	2023	—		Pieces
"I Wish You Cheated"	2023	73	MC: Gold	If You Only Knew and Bleeding Heart
"He Never Will"	2023	—		If You Only Knew
"Broken by You"	2024	—		Bleeding Heart
"Life at First Sight"	2024	—		Non-album singles
"Wrong Way" (with Two Friends)	2024	—		Non-album singles
"Crossfire" (with Frank Walker)	2024	—		Origin (Deluxe)
"Put You First"	2024	—		Non-album singles
"His Problem Instead"	2024	72		Non-album singles
"Here Again"	2025	—		What If?
"Blame on You"	2025	—		What If?
"Scared of Myself"	2025	—		What If?
"Friends Don't" (with Lauren Spencer Smith)	2025	—		What If?
"Every Lifetime"	2026	—		Non-album single
"Home"	2026	—		Filing for Love
"Temporary"	2026	—		Non-album singles
"Missing Piece" (with Frank Walker)	2026	—		Non-album singles
"—" denotes a recording that did not chart.

==== As featured artist ====
List of singles as featured artist, with year released and album name
Title	Year	Album/EP	Ref.
"You" (Shaggy featuring Alexander Stewart)	2019	Wah Gwaan?!	

=== Guest appearances ===
List of guest appearances, with other artists, year released, and album name
Title	Year	Other artist(s)	Album/EP
"Gone"	2024	Lost Frequencies	All Stand Together

== Tours ==
- Blame's on Me Tour (2023)
- The Bleeding Hearts Tour (2024)
- The Homecoming Tour (2024)
- Here Again Tour (2025)
- What If? World Tour (2025–2026)

== Awards and nominations ==
List of awards and nominations received by Alexander Stewart
Award	Year (Note: Indicates the year of ceremony. Each year is linked to the article about the awards held that year, wherever possible.)	Recipient(s)	Category	Result	Ref.
MTV Video Music Awards	2024	"If You Only Knew"	Video for Good	Nominated	
Juno Awards	2025	Himself	Breakthrough Artist or Group of the Year	Nominated	
Juno Awards	2025	Bleeding Heart	Pop Album of the Year	Nominated	
