= Original Doberman =

Studio album by Shaggy
- Released: July 1, 1994
- Recorded: c. 1989–1990
- Studio: Don-One Studios, Brooklyn, New York
- Genre: Reggae; dub
- Length: 47:55
- Label: Greensleeves
- Producer: Paul Henton; Bill Samples (remix); Scarface (remix)

Shaggy chronology
Pure Pleasure (1993)	Original Doberman (1994)	Boombastic (1995)

Professional ratings
Review scores
Source	Rating
Q	3/5 stars

Original Doberman is the second studio album released by Jamaican rapper Shaggy. The album, released on July 1, 1994, came less than a year after his debut, Pure Pleasure, but was in fact an unreleased record made circa. 1989–1990, as stated by the album sleeve, which states "to Shaggy and Rayvon—for making the album before going to War in Iraq" (both served in the Gulf War as members of the United States Marine Corps).

The album was released in an attempt to cash-in on the success of Pure Pleasure, but was a commercial failure, and failed to chart anywhere. The majority of the album was recorded in dub, and failed to emulate the style of more commercial recordings such as "Oh Carolina". "Bullet-Proof Buddy", "Jump and Rock", "Man a Yard" and "We Never Danced to the Rub-a-Dub Sound" had previously been released as independent singles in 1989 by producer Don Moodie.

The album was Shaggy's final release on Greensleeves, before being signed by Virgin Records. "Lately", a cover of the Stevie Wonder original, was included as a bonus track on the CD version of the album, having been used as the theme to popular Jamaican game show Lamba between 1994 and 1995.

An alternate version of the album, titled Original Shaggy in Dub, was independently released in 1996 by producer Don Moodie.

== Track listing ==
All tracks are written by Orville Burrell. All tracks produced by Don Moodie and Paul Henton.

Original Doberman track listing
No.	Title	Length
1.	"Kibbles and Bits"	3:51
2.	"Bullet-Proof Buddy"	3:28
3.	"We Never Danced to the Rub-a-Dub Sound" (featuring Rayvon)	3:27
4.	"Alimony"	3:52
5.	"Jump and Rock"	3:43
6.	"Chow" (featuring Sugar Minott)	3:42
7.	"P.H.A.T."	3:49
8.	"Wildfire" (featuring Rayvon)	3:54
9.	"Glamity Power"	3:40
10.	"Man a Yard"	3:21
11.	"Get Down to It" (featuring Rayvon)	3:39
12.	"Soldering"	3:36
13.	"Lately" (featuring Rayvon)	3:53
