= Folkes Brothers =

The Folkes Brothers were a Jamaican group, composed of John Folkes (the lead singer), Mico Folkes, and Eric Joseph ("Junior") Folkes, and are the originators of the hit single "Oh Carolina". The High Court of Justice in England legally established that John Folkes was the sole author of "Oh Carolina".

== History ==
In 1960, Prince Buster (then a relative unknown who was working as a DJ and bouncer for Coxsone Dodd) approached the Rastafarian percussionist Count Ossie, who had established one of the first Rastafarian camps in Wareika Hill, to record for him. After much encouragement from Prince Buster that he would keep the essence of the Niyabinghi -style drumming intact on the recording, he booked Count Ossie and his drummers along with Owen Gray on piano and Ronnie Bop on bass drum into a small recording studio. Once there, Buster did handclaps and imitated horn riffs while The Folkes Brothers, a trio of teenagers led by John and with his brothers, Mico and Junior, on backing vocals, captured the track in one take. It was the only recording that group ever did.

In 1994, John, Eric (Junior) and Mico Folkes were involved in a legal dispute with Buster over the authorship of the song, after a cover version by Shaggy became an international hit. It was eventually ruled by the High Court in London, England, that John Folkes held the copyright. Previously it was alleged that John Folkes had seemingly assigned the copyright to Greensleeves so that Shaggy's Pure Pleasure album could be released. This situation also included listing Henry Mancini as co-author, because it was alleged that Shaggy had sampled the "Peter Gunn" theme song. It has been noted that John Folkes never agreed to this, nor any assignment of the copyright to Greensleeves. This is no longer in dispute.

In 2011, a new group (now consisting Mico Folkes and Eric J. Folkes) recorded an album with their close musician friend, Jah D, in efforts to help promote his studio, while Jah D provided background music for 15 of the Folkes Brothers' songs, solely written by Mico and Eric J. "Junior". The original group was created by John. As such, he has been the only group member to receive any royalties and his estate is the sole owner of the copyright.

Dr. John Folkes (PhD summa cum laude in English literature from the University of Toronto) died on 29 August 2022 at the age of 81, survived by his wife Vilma, and three children. Junior Folkes died on 8 January 2024, leaving Mico Folkes the last surviving member of the Folkes Brothers, and who has now created a different group.

== Discography ==
=== Singles ===
- "Oh Carolina" (1961)

=== Albums ===
- Don't Leave Me Darling (2011)
