= That Girl (Maxi Priest song) =

1996 single by Maxi Priest

Single by Maxi Priest featuring Shaggy

from the album Man with the Fun
- B-side: "Ooh La La La"; "All the Way"; 1. "Tenderoni"
- Released: 10 June 1996
- Length: 4:00
- Label: Virgin
- Songwriters: Al Jackson Jr.; Booker T. Jones; Lewis Steinberg; Gary Benson; Steve Cropper; Robert Livingston; Shaun Pizzonia; Maxi Priest; Shaggy
- Producers: Robert Livingston; Shaun Pizzonia

Maxi Priest singles chronology
| "One More Chance" (1993) | "That Girl" (1996) | "Message in a Bottle" (1996) |

Shaggy singles chronology
| "The Train Is Coming" (1996) | "That Girl" (1996) | "Day Oh" (1996) |

"That Girl" is a song by English reggae singer Maxi Priest featuring Jamaican reggae musician Shaggy. It was released on 10 June 1996, by Virgin Records, as the first single from Priest's sixth album, Man with the Fun (1996). The song is co-written and produced by Robert Livingston and Shaun Pizzonia, and samples the 1962 instrumental "Green Onions" by Booker T. & the M.G.'s. "That Girl" reached the top 20 in at least eight countries, including the United Kingdom, where it peaked at No. 15 on the UK Singles Chart. It also peaked at No. 3 on the Finnish Singles Chart, No. 4 on the Canadian RPM 100 Hit Tracks chart and No. 7 on the Australian Singles Chart. In the US, the song peaked at No. 18 and 20 on the Cash Box Top 100 and Billboard Hot 100 charts.

== Critical reception ==
Larry Flick from Billboard magazine wrote, "Maxi Priest ushers in his new album, Man with the Fun, with a little festive toasting assistance from Shaggy. The two playfully mix it up on a finger-snapping ditty that is fueled by the sampled hook of 'Green Onions' by Booker T. & the MG's. Priest has rarely sounded so relaxed and sexy. With a steamy groove and a chorus that you will be singing along with by its close, this single is ripe for mega pop success."

== Track listings ==
- UK CD1 and cassette single; Australasian CD single
1. "That Girl" – 4:00
2. "That Girl" (urban mix) – 3:43
3. "That Girl" (club mix) – 8:03
4. "Ooh La La La" – 3:48
- UK CD2
1. "That Girl" – 4:00
2. "That Girl" (dub mix) – 7:11
3. "All the Way" – 5:04
4. "Tenderoni" – 3:43
- US CD and cassette single
1. "That Girl" – 4:00
2. "That Girl" (urban mix) – 3:43
3. "Heartbreak Lover" (featuring Beres Hammond and Buju Banton) – 3:25
4. "That Girl" (club edit) – 3:43
- US 12-inch single

A1. "That Girl" (LP version) – 4:00
A2. "That Girl" (club edit) – 3:43
A3. "That Girl" (club mix) – 8:03
B1. "That Girl" (urban extended mix) – 4:27
B2. "That Girl" (dubstramental) – 7:18
B3. "Heartbreak Lover" (featuring Beres Hammond and Buju Banton) – 3:25

== Charts ==
=== Weekly charts ===
| Chart (1996) | Peak position |
|---|---|
| Australia (ARIA) | 7 |
| Austria (Ö3 Austria Top 40) | 29 |
| Canada (Nielsen SoundScan) | 14 |
| Canada Top Singles (RPM) | 4 |
| Canada Adult Contemporary (RPM) | 18 |
| Canada Dance/Urban (RPM) | 1 |
| Europe (Eurochart Hot 100) | 39 |
| Europe Airplay (European Hit Radio) | 5 |
| Europe (European Dance Radio) | 2 |
| Finland (Suomen virallinen lista) | 3 |
| France Airplay (Music & Media) | 10 |
| Germany (GfK) | 52 |
| Hungary (Mahasz) | 7 |
| Hungary Airplay (Music & Media) | 6 |
| Iceland (Íslenski Listinn Topp 40) | 18 |
| Italy Airplay (Music & Media) | 11 |
| Netherlands (Dutch Top 40) | 26 |
| Netherlands (Single Top 100) | 35 |
| New Zealand (Recorded Music NZ) | 10 |
| Scottish Singles Sales (Official Charts) | 36 |
| Sweden (Sverigetopplistan) | 15 |
| Switzerland (Schweizer Hitparade) | 29 |
| UK Singles (Official Charts) | 15 |
| US Billboard Hot 100 | 20 |
| US Adult Top 40 (Billboard) | 39 |
| US Hot R&B Singles (Billboard) | 34 |
| US Maxi-Singles Sales (Billboard) | 42 |
| US Top 40/Mainstream (Billboard) | 16 |
| US Top 40/Rhythm-Crossover (Billboard) | 16 |
| US Cash Box Top 100 | 18 |

=== Year-end charts ===
| Chart (1996) | Position |
|---|---|
| Australia (ARIA) | 45 |
| Canada Top Singles (RPM) | 60 |
| Canada Dance/Urban (RPM) | 30 |
| Europe Airplay (European Hit Radio) | 37 |
| US Billboard Hot 100 | 90 |
| US Top 40/Mainstream (Billboard) | 61 |
| US Top 40/Rhythm-Crossover (Billboard) | 72 |

== Certifications ==
| Region | Certification | Certified units/sales |
|---|---|---|
| Australia (ARIA) | Gold | 35,000^{^} |
| New Zealand (RMNZ) | Platinum | 10,000^{*} |
^{*} Sales figures based on certification alone.^{^} Shipments figures based on certification alone.

== Release history ==
| Region | Date | Format(s) | Label(s) | Ref. |
|---|---|---|---|---|
| United Kingdom | 10 June 1996 | CD1; cassette | Virgin | |
| United Kingdom | 17 June 1996 | CD2 | Virgin | |
| Japan | 7 August 1996 | CD | Virgin | |
