= Wah Gwaan?! =

Studio album by Shaggy
- Released: 10 May 2019
- Genre: Dancehall
- Length: 48:24
- Label: The Cherrytree Music Company, Brooklyn Knights Entertainment, 300 Entertainment, Atlantic

Shaggy chronology
44/876 (2018)	Wah Gwaan?! (2019)	Hot Shot 2020 (2020)

Singles from Wah Gwaan?
- 1. "Use Me" Released: 21 November 2018; 2. "You" Released: 29 March 2019

Wah Gwaan?! is the twelfth studio album by Jamaican dancehall artist Shaggy. The album features guest appearances from Gene Noble, Alexander Stewart, and Noah Powa. The album was released on 10 May 2019.

== Background ==
The first single from the album, "Use Me", was released on 21 November 2018.

The second single from the album, "You", featuring Canadian singer Alexander Stewart, was released on 29 March 2019.

== Track listing ==
No.	Title	Length
1.	"Caribbean Way"	2:44
2.	"When She Loves Me" (featuring Rayvon)	4:48
3.	"You" (featuring Alexander Stewart)	4:12
4.	"Friends" (featuring Gene Noble)	2:59
5.	"Money Up" (featuring Noah Powa)	3:21
6.	"Supernatural" (featuring Stacy Barthe and Shenseea)	3:08
7.	"Wrong Room"	3:57
8.	"Praise"	4:08
9.	"Ketch Mi Up"	3:50
10.	"Use Me"	3:11
11.	"Makeup Sex" (featuring Nyanda)	3:20
12.	"Body Good" (featuring Nicky Jam)	3:24
13.	"Live"	3:44
14.	"Frenemy"	2:18
