= Wild 2nite =

Single by Shaggy featuring Olivia

from the album Clothes Drop
- B-side: "Ready fi di Ride"
- Released: September 5, 2005
- Recorded: 2005
- Genre: Reggae fusion
- Length: 3:29
- Label: Geffen
- Songwriters: Orville Burrell, Ricardo Ducent, Huey Dunbar, Robert Lyn, Robert Shakespeare
- Producer: Shaggy

Shaggy singles chronology
"Get My Party On" (2003)	"Wild 2nite" (2005)	"Ultimatum" (2006)

Olivia singles chronology
"So Sexy" (2005)	"Wild 2nite" (2005)	"Best Friend" (2005)

"Wild 2nite" is a song by Jamaican rapper Shaggy, featuring singer Olivia. The song was released on September 5, 2005, as the lead single from Shaggy's sixth studio album, Clothes Drop (2005). It was written by songwriters Orville Burrell, Ricardo Ducent, Huey Dunbar, Robert Lyn, and Robert Shakespeare and produced by Shaggy. "Wild 2nite" peaked at #61 on the UK Singles Chart.

== Track listing ==
UK CD1

1. "Wild 2nite" (featuring Olivia) - 3:20
2. "Ready fi di Ride" - 3:34

UK CD2

1. "Wild 2nite" (featuring Olivia) - 3:20
2. "Wild 2nite" (Birch Mix) - 3:24
3. "Wild 2nite" (MK's Wild West Remix) - 3:19
4. "Ready fi di Ride" - 3:34
5. "Wild 2nite" (Video) - 3:20
6. "Ready fi di Ride" (Video) - 3:34

== Charts ==
Weekly chart performance for "Wild 2nite"
Chart (2005)	Peak position
Finland (Suomen virallinen lista)	9
Germany (GfK)	40
Italy (FIMI)	23
Netherlands (Single Top 100)	59
Switzerland (Schweizer Hitparade)	26
UK Singles (Official Charts)	61
