= Summer in Kingston =

Studio album by Shaggy
- Released: 19 July 2011
- Genre: Reggae; dancehall; hip hop
- Length: 27:52; 35:21 (Lava edition)
- Label: Ranch Entertainment
- Producer: Shaggy; Teflon; Costi Ioniță

Shaggy chronology
Shaggy & Friends (2011)	Summer in Kingston (2011)	Rise (2012)

Singles from Summer in Kingston
- 1. "Fired Up (Fuck the Rece$$ion!)" Released: 8 March 2011; 2. "Sugarcane" Released: 16 July 2011; 3. "Dame" Released: 8 February 2012

Professional ratings
Review scores
Source	Rating
Allmusic	3.5/5 stars
Entertainment Weekly	B+

Summer in Kingston is the tenth studio album released by Jamaican dancehall artist Shaggy.

== Background ==
The album was first released via digital download on 19 July 2011, containing a total of eight tracks. Shaggy described the album as a "Summer follow-up" to Shaggy & Friends, which was released in January 2011. The album was mostly produced by Shaggy. The album's lead single, "Fired Up (Fuck the Rece$$ion!)", was released on 8 March 2011, and features vocals from Cuban-American rapper Pitbull. The album's second single, "Sugarcane", was released just three days prior to the album, and was produced by Teflon, formerly of hip-hop's Ruff Ryders Crew, and the producer of Eve's worldwide smash hit "Who's That Girl". The album was priced at $2.99 for a limited time through iTunes, Amazon and other major digital outlets, however, this promotion ended on Labor Day. In 2012, Shaggy announced plans to release a 'Lava edition' of the album on 7 February 2012, this time being issued both physically and via digital download. The 'Lava edition' was preceded by the album's third single, a new version of "Dame" featuring Kat DeLuna. The 'Lava edition' contains two brand new songs - "Hurting" and "She Gives Me Love", featuring Sly & Robbie.

== Track listing ==
No.	Title	Writer(s)	Producer(s)	Length
1.	"Just Another Girl" (featuring Tarrus Riley)	Orville Burrell; Rand Ralph Van Rheenen; Tarrus Riley; Teflon; Sheldon M. Harris; Tracy Randall	Teflon; Shaggy	2:56
2.	"Sugarcane"	Andre Fennell; Orville Burrell; Teflon; Sheldon M. Harris * Tracy Randall	Teflon; Shaggy	3:27
3.	"Dame" (featuring Celia)	Andre Fennell; Costi Ioniță; Dimitriu Silviu Aurelian; Monica Oana Radu; Orville Burrell * Tracy Randall	Costi Ioniță	3:13
4.	"Feeling Alive" (featuring Agent Sasco)	A. Mazin; Agent Sasco; Djamel Fezari; Kore; Orville Burrell	Shaggy	3:23
5.	"End of the World (Drink Up)"	Andre Fennell; Orville Burrell; Teflon; Sheldon M. Harris * Tracy Randall	Teflon; Shaggy	3:10
6.	"Soldiers Story" (featuring Jaiden)	James Roston; Orville Burrell; Ricardo Ducent; Shaun Pizzonia	Shaggy	3:47
7.	"Fired Up (Fuck the Rece$$ion!)" (featuring Pitbull)	Andre Fennell; Costi Ioniță; Orville Burrell * Tracy Randall	Shaggy	3:18
8.	"The Only One (Lie to Me)" (featuring Jaiden)	Andre Fennell; Andrew Bassford; Jaiden; Orville Burrell * Tracy Randall; Shaun Pizzonia	Shaggy	4:36

Lava edition
No.	Title	Writer(s)	Producer(s)	Length
1.	"Just Another Girl" (featuring Tarrus Riley)	Orville Burrell; Rand Ralph Van Rheenen; Tarrus Riley; Teflon; Sheldon M. Harris	Teflon; Shaggy	2:56
2.	"She Gives Me Love" (featuring Sly & Robbie)		Sly & Robbie; Sting International	3:39
3.	"Feeling Alive" (featuring Agent Sasco)	A. Mazin; Agent Sasco; Djamel Fezari; Kore; Orville Burrell	Shaggy	3:23
4.	"Dame" (featuring Kat Deluna)	Andre Fennell; Costi Ioniță; Dimitriu Silviu Aurelian; Monica Oana Radu; Orville Burrell	Costi Ioniță	3:28
5.	"Sugarcane"	Andre Fennell; Orville Burrell; Teflon; Sheldon M. Harris	Teflon; Shaggy	3:27
6.	"Fired Up (Fuck the Rece$$ion!)" (featuring Pitbull)	Andre Fennell; Costi Ioniță; Orville Burrell * Tracy Randall	Shaggy	3:18
7.	"Hurting"			3:49
8.	"Soldiers Story" (featuring Jaiden)	James Roston; Orville Burrell; Ricardo Ducent; Shaun Pizzonia	Shaggy	3:47
9.	"The Only One (Lie to Me)" (featuring Jaiden)	Andre Fennell; Andrew Bassford; Jaiden; Orville Burrell; Shaun Pizzonia	Shaggy	4:36
10.	"End of the World (Drink Up)"	Andre Fennell; Orville Burrell; Teflon; Sheldon M. Harris	Teflon; Shaggy	3:10
