= Pure Pleasure =

Studio album by Shaggy
- Released: July 30, 1993
- Recorded: 1992–1993
- Genre: Reggae; rap
- Length: 60:02
- Label: Virgin
- Producer: O. Burrell

Shaggy chronology
| Pure Pleasure (1993) | Original Doberman (1994) |

Pure Pleasure is the debut album released by Jamaican singer Shaggy. The album was released on July 30, 1993. The album spawned four singles: "Oh Carolina", which was a dancehall remake of a ska hit by the Folkes Brothers, reached number one on the UK Singles Chart; "Nice and Lovely", which reached number 46 on the UK Singles Chart; "Soon Be Done", which peaked at number 39, and "Big Up", which was released as the main theme from the movie Made in America.

== Reception ==
Professional ratings
Review scores
| Source | Rating |
|---|---|
| AllMusic | 2.5/5 stars |
| Robert Christgau | (neither) |
| Los Angeles Times | 3/4 stars |
| NME | (6/10) |
| Q | 4/5 stars |
| Select | 2/5 medals |
| Smash Hits | 3/5 stars |
| Vibe | (favorable) |

Elena Oumano of the Los Angeles Times wrote, "This Brooklyn-based reggae rapper has two areas of interest--the bedroom and the dance floor. That’s evident from the opening track and title song, a cheerfully irreverent reworking of a classic spiritual. Producer Sting International frames Shaggy’s lighthearted rapping with fat, squishy beats and unexpected samples--like a 'Carmen' aria on 'Bedroom Bounty Hunter' and the 'Peter Gunn' theme on 'Oh Carolina'."

== Track listing ==
Pure Pleasure track listing
| No. | Title | Length |
|---|---|---|
| 1. | "Soon Be Done" | 4:00 |
| 2. | "Give Thanks and Praise" | 3:53 |
| 3. | "Lust" | 3:49 |
| 4. | "Oh Carolina" | 3:10 |
| 5. | "Tek Set" | 4:01 |
| 6. | "Bedroom Bounty Hunter" | 4:00 |
| 7. | "Nice and Lovely" (featuring Rayvon) | 3:43 |
| 8. | "Love How Them Flex" | 3:56 |
| 9. | "All Virgins" | 3:11 |
| 10. | "Ah-E-A-Oh" (featuring Sylva) | 4:06 |
| 11. | "It Bun Me" | 3:36 |
| 12. | "Big Up" (featuring Rayvon) | 3:26 |
| 13. | "Bow Wow Wow" | 3:39 |
| 14. | "Follow Me" | 3:58 |
| 15. | "Mampie" | 3:44 |
| 16. | "Oh Carolina" (Raas Bumba Claat Version) | 3:50 |

== Charts ==
Chart performance for Pure Pleasure
| Chart (1993) | Peak position |
|---|---|
| Australian Albums (ARIA) | 98 |
| Austrian Albums (Ö3 Austria) | 11 |
| German Albums (Offizielle Top 100) | 75 |
| New Zealand Albums (RMNZ) | 46 |
| Swedish Albums (Sverigetopplistan) | 42 |
| Swiss Albums (Schweizer Hitparade) | 32 |
| UK Albums (OCC) | 67 |
