= Big Up (song) =

Single by Shaggy and Rayvon

from the album Pure Pleasure
- B-side: "The Version"; "Skit Out"
- Released: December 2, 1993
- Recorded: 1993
- Genre: Reggae; dancehall
- Length: 4:01
- Label: Jet Star
- Songwriter(s): Orville Burrell; Bruce Brewster
- Producer(s): Shaggy

Shaggy and Rayvon singles chronology
"Soon Be Done" (1993)	"Big Up" (1993)	"Bullet Proof Buddy" (1994)

"Big Up" is the fourth and final single from Jamaican reggae artist Shaggy's debut studio album, Pure Pleasure.

== Background ==
The single was released on December 2, 1993. The song was originally recorded under Greensleeves Records, however, was released as a single by Jet Star Records for reasons unknown. A music video for the song premiered in November 1993, and in November 2009, the video was uploaded to Shaggy's official VEVO account. The promoted single version of the song was remixed by Pressure Point, who also features on the track. The single was released on three official formats, backed with new tracks "The Version" and "Skit Out". Today, it remains one of Shaggy's rarest physical singles.

== Track listing ==
United Kingdom

- CD single / 12" vinyl
1. "Big Up" (The Remix – Featuring Pressure Point) – 4:01
2. "Big Up" (The Original Mix) – 3:38
3. "The Version" – 3:25
- Cassette
1. "Big Up" (The Remix – Featuring Pressure Point) – 4:01
2. "Big Up" (The Original Mix) – 3:38
3. "Skit Out" – 4:03

United States

- 7" vinyl
1. "Big Up" (The Original Mix) – 3:38
2. "Big Up" (Instrumental) – 3:38
- 12" vinyl
1. "Big Up" (The Original Mix) – 3:38
2. "Skit Out" – 4:03
3. "The Version" – 3:25
