= Shaggy & Friends =

Studio album by Shaggy
- Released: January 19, 2011
- Genre: Reggae, dancehall
- Length: 45:52
- Label: Big Yard
- Producer: Orville Burrell

Shaggy chronology
Best of Shaggy: The Boombastic Collection (2008)	Shaggy & Friends (2011)	Summer in Kingston (2011)

Shaggy & Friends is the ninth studio album released by Jamaican dancehall artist Shaggy, released exclusively via digital download on January 19, 2011. It is Shaggy's first album ever not to be issued physically. The album was his first studio album in four years, following 2007's Intoxication. The album was entirely produced by Shaggy. The album featured collaborations with Shaggy's long-time collaborators Rayvon and RikRok.

== Track listing ==
1. "Too Cute" (featuring Ty-Arie) - 3:32
2. "Good Times Roll" (featuring Ty-Arie) - 2:31
3. "Believer" (featuring Jaiden) - 3:27
4. "Everything You Need" (featuring Shaun Pizzonia) - 3:21
5. "Can't Fight This Feeling" (featuring Chris Birch) - 3:26
6. "Thank You" (featuring Ricardo 'RikRok' Ducent) - 2:48
7. "Shaggy & Rayvon Show" (featuring Rayvon) - 3:57
8. "I'm Rebel" (featuring Chris Birch) - 3:32
9. "This Could Be Your Day" (featuring Brian and Tony Gold) - 4:04
10. "I'm Sorry" (featuring Qwote) - 3:51
11. "Holla At You" (featuring D-lynx) - 2:24
12. "Gal Roll" (featuring D-lynx) - 2:56
13. "You See Him Face" (featuring Chris Martin) - 2:47
14. "Needle Eye" (featuring Rayvon) - 3:16
