= Clothes Drop =

Studio album by Shaggy
- Released: September 2, 2005
- Length: 61:29
- Label: Geffen
- Producers: Armando Colon; Sly Dunbar; Michael Fletcher; Anthony Kelly; Tony "CD" Kelly; Robert Livingston; Shaun Pizzonia; Robbie Shakespeare; Dwayne Shippy; Soulshock & Karlin; Scott Storch; will.i.am; ZLink

Shaggy chronology
Lucky Day (2002)	Clothes Drop (2005)	Intoxication (2007)

Singles from Clothes Drop
- 1. "Wild 2Nite" Released: September 5, 2005; 2. "Ultimatum" Released: 2005

Clothes Drop is the seventh studio album released by Jamaican singer Shaggy. It was released by Geffen Records on September 2, 2005. When the album was released promotionally in 2004, it was debated that the album would not be commercially released. However, over a year later, the album was officially released.

== Critical reception ==
Professional ratings
Aggregate scores
Source	Rating
Metacritic	(61/100)
Review scores
Source	Rating
AllMusic	3.5/5 stars
Billboard	(favorable)
Blender	1/5 stars
Entertainment Weekly	C−
The Guardian	3/5 stars
Rolling Stone	3/5 stars
Vibe	4/5 stars

Clothes Drop garnered positive reviews from music critics who praised the diverse avenues of dancehall and pop music the tracks go through. At Metacritic, which assigns a normalized rating out of 100 to reviews from mainstream critics, the album received an average score of 61, based on 7 reviews.

Rob Kenner of Vibe gave praise to Shaggy's dynamic vocal delivery and his taste for old-school dancehall in romantic dance tracks and depth-filled social tunes, saying that "Clothesdrop seamlessly blends Shaggy's sharpest pop sensibilities with his (much slept-on) roughneck pedigree." Rolling Stone's Christian Hoard felt the album carried an amalgam of tracks ranging from hip-hop-styled and club-oriented to mind-numbingly generic and a bit preachy, saying that "[T]he entire album has a mixed-bag feel, but "Would You Be" shows that his gift for winsome melody and R&B clarity is mostly intact." Dorian Lynskey of The Guardian said that "Clothes Drop is a typically canny and diverse selection: bona fide dancehall cuts interspersed with hooky pop." Entertainment Weekly's David Browne said that despite tracks like "Repent" that better display his talents, he found Shaggy trying to regain his hit-making glory days with middling results, concluding that "Maybe he should lose the monotonous, low-rent beats and banal-hook girls (and boys)." Writing for Blender, Jon Caramanica heavily criticized Shaggy for attempting to showcase his dancehall credentials with a grating voice and without a featured artist to work lyrics off like Rikrok, saying that "Instead, there’s a Black Eyed Pea (“Shut Up and Dance”), a Pussycat Doll (“Supa Hypnotic”) and the palpable sweat of a man trying to figure out what he’s good at, a decade too late."

== Track listing ==
No.	Title	Writer(s)	Producer(s)	Length
1.	"Clothes Drop"	Orville Burrell; Ricardo Ducent; Sly Dunbar; Robbie Lyn; Robbie Shakespeare	Dunbar; Shakespeare; ZLink	4:04
2.	"Ready fi di Ride"	Burrell; Ducent; Maurice Gregory; Anthony Kelly	Kelly	3:34
3.	"Broadway"	Burrell; Ducent; Anthony Hawthorne; Barrington Levy; Dwayne Shippy	Shippy	2:35
4.	"Wild 2nite" (featuring Olivia)	Burrell; Armando Colon; Olivia Longott	Colon; Shaun "Sting Int'l" Pizzonia	3:29
5.	"Back in the Days" (featuring Rayvon)	Burrell; Ducent; Michael Fletcher	Fletcher	4:00
6.	"Supa Hypnotic" (featuring Nicole Scherzinger)	Burrell; Alexander Cantrall; Kenneth Karlin; Lindy Robbins; Carsten Schack	Soulshock & Karlin	3:35
7.	"Would You Be" (featuring Brian "Gold" Thompson)	Burrell; Christopher Birch; Colon; Ducent; Pizzonia; K.B. Robinson; Thompson	Colon; Pizzonia	4:16
8.	"Stand Up" (featuring Natasha Watkins)	Burrell; Birch; Ducent; Derrick Harriott; Robert Livingston	Livingston	3:34
9.	"Repent"	Burrell; Ducent; Gregory; Tony "CD" Kelly; Pizzonia	Kelly	3:42
10.	"Luv Me Up"	Burrell; Ducent; Gregory; Kelly; Pizzonia	Kelly	3:31
11.	"Ahead in Life"	Burrell; Colon; Ducent; Kelly	Colon	3:16
12.	"Ultimatum"	Burrell; Colon; Ducent; Pizzonia	Pizzonia; Colon	3:33
13.	"Shut Up & Dance" (featuring will.i.am)	William Adams; Adrian Belew; Junior Curtis; Chris Frantz; Pizzonia; Steven Stanley; Laura Weymouth	will.i.am	3:24
14.	"Don't Ask Her That" (featuring Nicole Scherzinger)	Burrell; Ducent; Scott Storch	Storch; Thom Panunzio^{[a]}	4:25
15.	"Road Block" (featuring Rikrok)	Burrell; Ducent; Quentin Harris; Pizzonia	Pizzonia	3:32
16.	"Gone with Angels"	Burrell; Colon; Ducent; Pizzonia	Pizzonia; Fletcher	4:05
17.	"Letter to My Kids"	Burrell; Ducent; Pizzonia	Pizzonia; Fletcher	2:54

Japanese bonus track
No.	Title	Writer(s)	Producer(s)	Length
18.	"Hold Me"	Burrell; Ducent; Pizzonia	Pizzonia	3:03

UK bonus tracks
No.	Title	Writer(s)	Producer(s)	Length
18.	"Goodie Goodie""	Burrell; Ducent; Pizzonia	Pizzonia	3:20
19.	"Sexy Gyal Whind"	Burrell; Ducent; Pizzonia	Pizzonia	3:03

Notes

- ^{^[a]} signifies additional producer

Sample credits

- "Broadway" contains a sample of "Broader than Broadway" as written by Barrington Levy.
- "Stand Up" contains a sample of "Stop That Man" as written by Derrick Harriott.
- "Shut Up & Dance" contains elements of "Genius of Love" as written by Tom Tom Club.

== Credits and personnel ==
Credits lifted from the liner notes of Clothes Drop.

- C. Duck Anderson – Background Vocals
- Alex Cantrall – Producer, Musician
- Chico Chin – Musician
- Armando Colon – Producer, Engineer, Musician
- Heather Cummings – Background Vocals
- J. Curtis – Guitar
- Sly Dunbar – Producer, Musician
- Cliff Feiman – Production Coordination
- Neal Ferrazzani – Assistant
- Michael Fletcher – Producer, Musician
- Chris Gehringer – Mastering
- Brian Gold – Background Vocals
- Tony Gold – Background Vocals
- Tony Green – Musician
- Maurice Gregory – Musician
- Damion Hall – Engineer
- Nellee Hooper – Vocal Producer
- Kameron Houff – Engineer
- A. Kelly – Musician
- Tony Kelly – Producer, Engineer, Musician, Revision
- Martin Kierszenbaum – Keyboards, A&R
- Robert Livingston – Producer, Overdubs, Executive Producer
- Robert Lyn – Musician
- Thom Panunzio – Producer, Mixing
- Shaun "Sting Int'l" Pizzonia – Producer, Engineer, Overdubs, Executive Producer, Mixing, Musician
- Claude "Weakhand" Reynolds – Mixing
- J. Peter Robinson – Art Direction
- Robbie Shakespeare – Producer, Musician
- Fabian Smith – Keyboard Overdubs
- Soulshock – Producer, Engineer, Musician
- Scott Storch – Producer
- Lincoln Thomas – Guitar
- Gita Williams – Product Manager

== Charts ==
Weekly chart performance for Clothes Drop
Chart (2005)	Peak position
Austrian Albums (Ö3 Austria)	61
French Albums (SNEP)	70
German Albums (Offizielle Top 100)	62
Swiss Albums (Schweizer Hitparade)	31
US Reggae Albums (Billboard)	2
US Billboard 200	144
