= Aidonia =

Jamaican Deejay

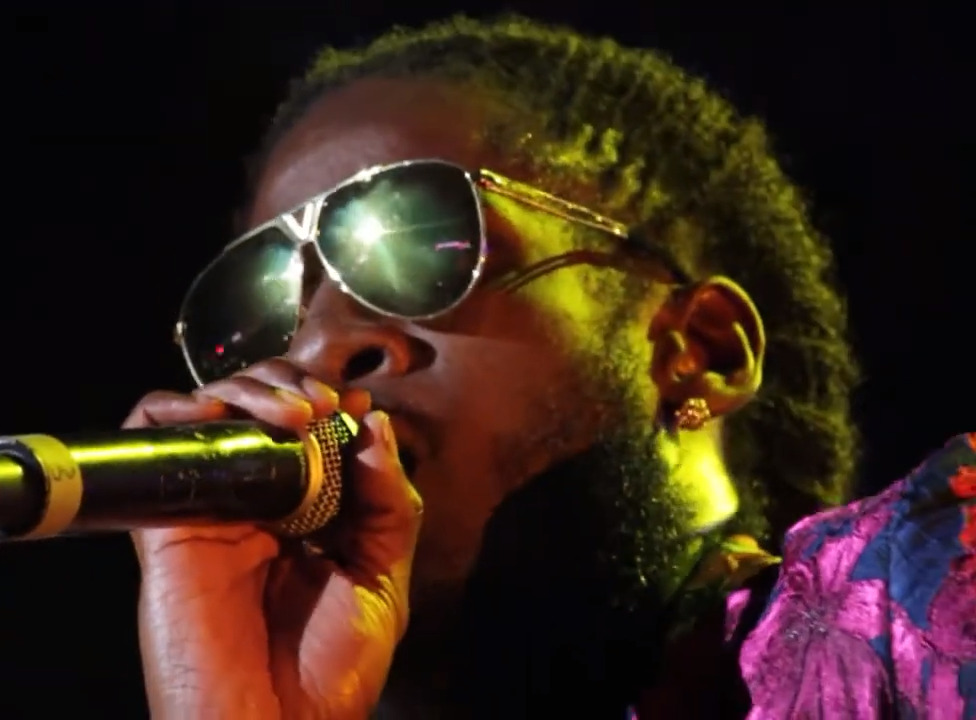
- Aidonia in 2018
- Born: Sheldon Aitana Ricardo Lawrence; 6 April 1981 (age 45); Kingston, Jamaica
- Other names: Didi, Donia, 1Voice
- Citizenship: Jamaican
- Education: Meadowbrook Highl
- Occupation: Musician
- Years active: 2005-present
- Spouse: Kimberly Megan
- Children: King Khalif born January 25, 2013, Kenzo Lawrence born Dec 18, 2023
- Musical career
- Genres: Dancehall; Reggae
- Instruments: Vocals
- Labels: VP Records; (JOP) Jag One Productions

Aidonia (born Sheldon Aitana Ricardo Lawrence, 6 April 1981) is a Jamaican dancehall and reggae artist from Kingston, Jamaica. He became active in early 2004, and has released albums on the record labels, VP Records and Jag One Productions.

Aidonia has also released in the mixtape "Bolt Action", in collaboration with Federation Sound, Equiknoxx Music/Jerusalem Music and Business Class. The mixtape utilizes classic hip-hop instrumentals with Aidonia's lyrical melodies overlaying and features artistes Chino, Lil Joe, and fellow JOP label-mate, Govana (formerly Deablo)

== Life and career ==
Born Sheldon Aitana Ricardo Lawrence in Kingston, Jamaica, Aidonia is the second of four children for his mother, who was a teacher, and his father, an ex-soldier. He took his stage name from the first two letters in his middle name 'Aitana', and 'Donia', a name which he earned while playing football.

Aidonia attended Mona Heights Primary, then Meadowbrook High. After watching a tape of Sting 1993 with the clash between Beenie Man, and his icon Bounty Killer, Aidonia decided to become a deejay.

He began re-enacting the clash for classmates and friends, writing his own lyrics and formed the JAG1 (Jah A Guide)(JOP) crew with friends.

After being expelled, he relocated to the United States with his father and worked at FedEx. For the next three years, he visited Jamaica regularly and did a few 'minor' things on the dancehall scene in New York. While in New York, he was encouraged by some to return to Jamaica in order to get his career going.

He met Mr. G (then known as Goofy) and recorded his first single 'Many a Dem' in October 2003 on Goofy's Young Blood label. Soon after, he began working with Rod Pinnock of Orizen Entertainment, and in early 2004, he became a performer at a weekly event called "Battle Thursdays".

In the latter part of 2004, Aidonia was approached by Cordell "Skatta"' Burrell who invited him to record at his studio. Two months later, Aidonia had his first hit, the song "Lolly" which was done on Skatta's Irish Dance riddim. In October 2005 "Lolly" was included on VP Records' annual Strictly The Best (Volume 33) compilation.

In 2011 Artiste Aidonia has recently started pushing forward his J.O.P members Govana, Shokryme, Jayds, Tanso, Size 10. The group has had a few hit collabs such as "All 14", and "Run Road.

In 2013 Aidonia had a son with fiancé Kimberly Megan and the two married in September 2016.

On his birthday on 6 April 2020 Aidonia released his Dats a Trap mixtape featuring 17 tracks.

== Family ==
Aidonia is married to Kimberly Megan. In 2022, the couple's son Khalif Lawrence died at the age of 9. Khalif's death received condolences from fellow musicians and fans.
