= Oh Carolina =

1960 single by Folkes Brothers

"Oh Carolina" is a 1958 song by the Folkes Brothers, produced by Prince Buster and released in 1960, after which it became an early ska hit. It was covered by many various artists, including Shaggy in 1993.

== Folkes Brothers version ==
"Oh Carolina"

Single by Folkes Brothers
- B-side: "I Met a Man"
- Released: 1960
- Recorded: 1960
- Studio: RJR (Kingston)
- Genre: Ska
- Label: Buster Wild Bells
- Songwriter: John Folkes
- Producer: Prince Buster

The original version of the song was recorded by Jamaican vocal trio the Folkes Brothers (John, Mico, and Junior Folkes) and was produced by Prince Buster at RJR studios in Kingston. The song was written by John Folkes in 1958 about his girlfriend (who was actually named Noelena). The group had met Buster while auditioning at Duke Reid's liquor store and Buster decided that he wanted to record the song. According to the brothers, Buster paid them £60 for the recording. Buster claims he paid £100.

Buster travelled to the Wareika Hills to find a Niyabinghi group to play on a recording session, and brought Count Ossie and his group of drummers (Count Ossie's Afro-Combo) back to the studio, where they played on "Oh Carolina". "Oh Carolina" was a landmark single in the development of Jamaican modern music (ska, rocksteady and reggae) specially for the incorporation of African-influenced Niyabinghi-style drumming and chanting, and for the exposure it gave to the Rastas, who at the time were marginalised in Jamaican society. The track's piano riff was performed by Owen Gray. The single was licensed to Blue Beat Records for release in the UK in 1961.

The two tracks on the single (The B-side was "I Met a Man") were the only songs recorded by The Folkes Brothers as a trio. Mico and Junior Folkes re-recorded the song without John for the 2011 album Don't Leave Me Darling, the first release credited to the Folkes Brothers since the early 1960s. "Oh Carolina" was later reissued on the Prince Buster label. The song was also recorded in 1973 by Count Ossie, on his album Grounation, and in 1975 by Junior Byles.

=== Track listing ===
Original release

A: "Oh Carolina"
B: "I Met a Man"

Prince Buster label reissue

A: "Oh Carolina"
B: "Chubby" – Prince Buster and the All Stars

Other releases

"Oh Carolina" was also issued as the B-side to Prince Buster's "Madness" on a 1961 single on the Fab label, and was included on a 1978 12-inch single of "Big Five".

== Shaggy version ==
"Oh Carolina"

Single by Shaggy

from the album Pure Pleasure and Sliver: Music from the Motion Picture
- B-side: "Rivers of Babylon"; "Bow Wow Wow"; "Love Me Up"
- Released: 25 January 1993
- Genre: Reggae; dancehall
- Length: 3:11
- Label: Virgin; Greensleeves (UK)
- Songwriters: Henry Mancini; John Folkes
- Producer: Sting International

Shaggy singles chronology
"Oh Carolina" (1993)	"Nice and Lovely" (1993)

"Oh Carolina" was covered by Jamaican musician Shaggy and released in January 1993 by Virgin Records as the lead single from his debut album, Pure Pleasure (1993). Produced by Shaun Pizzonia, it became an international hit following its use in the 1993 film Sliver. In the United Kingdom, it became the first of Shaggy's four chart-topping singles, spending two weeks at the summit of the UK Singles Chart in March 1993. In the United States, the song received major crossover airplay on alternative rock radio, and as a result, it peaked at number 14 on the Billboard Modern Rock Tracks chart. The song's success returned reggae music to mainstream popularity in the UK. The accompanying music video for "Oh Carolina" received heavy rotation on MTV Europe in May 1993.

=== Critical reception ===
AllMusic editor Alex Henderson described the song as an "infectious interpretation". Larry Flick from Billboard magazine felt that "gruff toasting and chanting are balanced by a clanging shuffle-beat." He added that it is "poised for instant pop radio success". Chuck Eddy from Entertainment Weekly called it "joyous", noting the "lusty humor". Tom Ewing of Freaky Trigger stated that Shaggy's take on the song "acknowledges its debt to the past right away – sampling the intro from the Folkes Brothers' 1960 original. Not just a nod of respect, it's a canny move, as the crackling, wheezing shanty-town piano sounded like nothing else on 1993 radio, giving "Oh Carolina" instant cut-through." Dave Sholin from the Gavin Report viewed it as "an exciting original creation which can't help but bring excitement to radio."

James Masterton wrote in his weekly UK chart commentary, "If there is a dance craze at the moment it certainly has to be this 'dancehall' style of ragga". James Hamilton from Music Week's RM Dance Update described it as a "gruff ragga revamp" and "catchy". Seamus Quinn from NME wrote, "Ragga Sleaze to please that could have only come from the States. Musically it's almost rockabilly ragga with Motown snippets and weird boogie time themes. If this wasn't bizarre enough, the lyrical content gets this week's Roger Mellie award for sheer rudeness. Not one for the Student Unions of this world, I fear, but this is genuine out-of-order humour with a compelling hook. Just nod yer head and grin."

Al Weisel from Rolling Stone remarked that featuring "the hard-hitting rhythms and relentless vocals of dance hall, "Oh Carolina" also harked back to the joyousness and soul that characterized the pre-Rastafarian Jamaican music of the '60s: a sense of fun that's been lost to some extent amid the sexism and violence glorified in a lot of dance hall." Charles Aaron from Spin wrote, "His voice a flu-season growl, 24-year-old Shaggy comes off like a bewildered Studio One relic who wandered into a dancehall booby trap of pings, dings, and rattles. J. Raff Allen produces like a Spike Jones fan." Christina Pazzanese from Vibe constated that "with its familiar, brassy Peter Gunn riff and goofy singalong lyrics, it's an instant favourite with even the most unwavering of dancehall-haters and seems destined to be the music's next breakthrough American smash."

=== Track listings ===
- UK 7-inch and cassette single; European CD single
1. "Oh Carolina" (radio version) – 3:10
2. "Oh Carolina" (Raas Bumba Claat version) – 3:48
- UK 12-inch single

A1. "Oh Carolina" (radio version)
A2. "Oh Carolina" (Raas Bumba Claat version)
B1. "Rivers of Babylon" (featuring Rayvon)

- Standard CD single
1. "Oh Carolina" (radio version) – 3:10
2. "Oh Carolina" (Raas Bumba Claat version) – 3:48
3. "Oh Carolina" (Uptown 10001 version)
4. "Bow Wow Wow"
- US 12-inch single
1. "Oh Carolina" (Raas Bumba Claat version) – 3:15
2. "Oh Carolina" (12-inch Flastbush mix) – 3:06
3. "Oh Carolina" (radio mix) – 3:53
4. "Love Me Up" (Dance Hall mix) – 3:51
5. "Love Me Up" (Hip Hot mix) – 3:51
6. "Love Me Up" (Version Up) – 3:51
- US cassette single
1. "Oh Carolina" (radio mix) – 3:53
2. "Oh Carolina" (12-inch Flastbush mix) – 3:06
3. "Oh Carolina" (Raas Bumba Claat version) – 3:15
4. "Love Me Up" (Dance Hall mix) – 3:51

=== Charts ===
==== Weekly charts ====
Chart (1993)	Peak position
Australia (ARIA)	5
Austria (Ö3 Austria Top 40)	2
Belgium (Ultratop 50 Flanders)	4
Canada Retail Singles (The Record)	1
Canada Top Singles (RPM)	38
Canada Dance/Urban (RPM)	1
Denmark (IFPI)	4
Europe (Eurochart Hot 100)	4
Europe (European Dance Radio)	6
Europe (European Hit Radio)	9
Finland (Suomen virallinen lista)	5
France (SNEP)	33
Germany (GfK)	3
Greece (Pop + Rock)	5
Ireland (IRMA)	1
Israel (Israeli Singles Chart)	15
Netherlands (Dutch Top 40)	6
Netherlands (Single Top 100)	6
New Zealand (Recorded Music NZ)	2
Norway (VG-lista)	4
Sweden (Sverigetopplistan)	3
Switzerland (Schweizer Hitparade)	3
UK Singles (Official Charts)	1
UK Airplay (Music Week)	1
UK Dance (Music Week)	6
US Billboard Hot 100	59
US Alternative Airplay (Billboard)	14
US Hot Rap Songs (Billboard)	43
US Cash Box Top 100	62

==== Year-end charts ====
Chart (1993)	Position
Australia (ARIA)	34
Austria (Ö3 Austria Top 40)	14
Belgium (Ultratop)	34
Canada Dance/Urban (RPM)	11
Europe (Eurochart Hot 100)	12
Germany (Media Control)	24
Netherlands (Dutch Top 40)	48
Netherlands (Single Top 100)	37
New Zealand (RIANZ)	4
Sweden (Topplistan)	25
Switzerland (Schweizer Hitparade)	29
UK Singles (OCC)	7
UK Airplay (Music Week)	18

==== Decade-end charts ====
Chart (1990–1999)	Position
Canada (Nielsen SoundScan)	76

=== Certifications ===
Region	Certification	Certified units/sales
Australia (ARIA)	Gold	35,000^{^}
Germany (BVMI)	Gold	250,000^{^}
New Zealand (RMNZ)	Gold	5,000^{*}
United Kingdom (BPI)	Gold	400,000^{^}
^{*} Sales figures based on certification alone.^{^} Shipments figures based on certification alone.

=== Release history ===
Region	Date	Format(s)	Label(s)	Ref.
United Kingdom	25 January 1993	12-inch vinyl	Greensleeves	
United Kingdom	8 February 1993	7-inch vinyl; CD; cassette	Greensleeves	
Australia	10 May 1993	CD	EMI Music Australia	
Australia	23 May 1993	Cassette	EMI Music Australia	
Japan	28 July 1993	CD	Virgin	

== Dispute over authorship ==
Following the success of Shaggy's version, John Folkes was involved in a legal dispute with Prince Buster over the authorship. As was common with Jamaican releases of the era, the song was credited on the label to the producer, in this case "C. Campbell" aka Prince Buster, and Buster claimed that he had written the song about a former girlfriend. Folkes' claim was upheld in the UK High Court in 1994.

== Other cover versions ==
The Jamaican ska and reggae trombonist Rico Rodriguez recorded an instrumental version entitled "Carolina" as a B-side to his 1980 single, "Sea Cruise".

In 1993, Vic Sotto, Francis Magalona, Richie D'Horsie and Michael V. covered a Tagalog parody version of the same song from the movie Ano Ba Yan? 2.

Jamaican artist Yellowman created a popular cover version on his 1994 album Prayer

In February 1995, South Korean pop-group Roo'ra released a Korean version, with the title "날개 잃은 천사" ("Nalgae irun chunsa"; "Angels that lost their wings").

The Romanian-Romani band Taraf de Haïdouks included a cover titled "Carolina" featuring Kočani Orkestar on their album Band Of Gypsies.
