= Shaggy (musician) =

Jamaican-American reggae musician (born 1968)

Shaggy OD
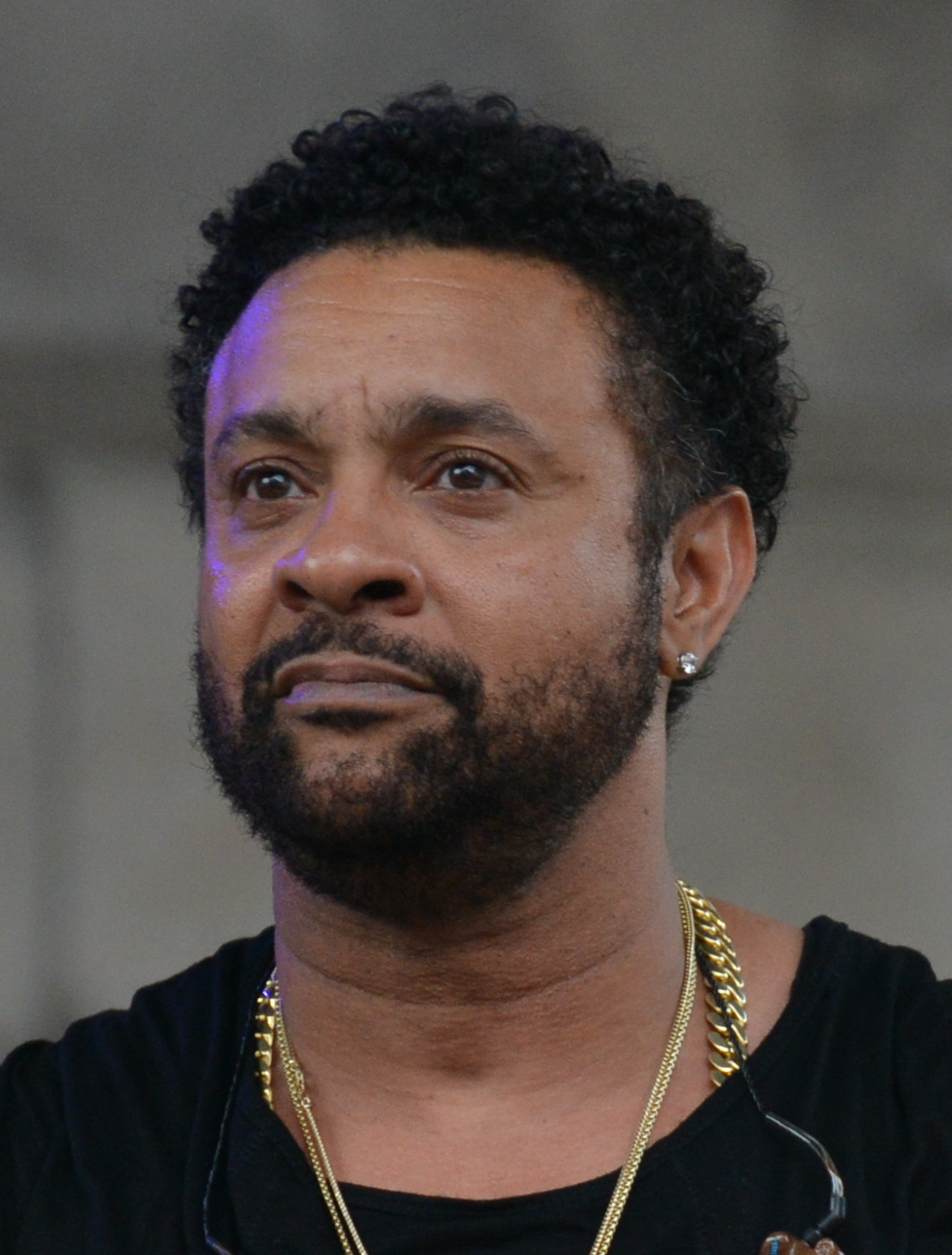
- Shaggy performing in 2018
- Born: Orville Richard Burrell; October 22, 1968 (age 58); Kingston, Jamaica
- Citizenship: Jamaica; United States
- Occupations: Rapper; singer; deejay; songwriter
- Years active: 1992–present
- Spouse: Rebecca Packer (m. 2014)
- Children: 5, including Robb Banks
- Musical career
- Origin: New York City, U.S.
- Genres: Reggae; dancehall; hip-hop; reggae fusion
- Instruments: Vocals
- Labels: EMI; Virgin; MCA; Geffen; Universal; Big Yard; Ranch; VP
- Website: shaggyonline.com
- Military career
- Allegiance: United States
- Branch: United States Marine Corps
- Service years: 1988–1992
- Rank: Lance corporal
- Conflicts: Persian Gulf War

Orville Richard Burrell OD (born October 22, 1968), known professionally as Shaggy, is a Jamaican-American reggae musician who scored hits with the songs "It Wasn't Me", "Boombastic", "In the Summertime", "Oh Carolina", and "Angel". He has been nominated for eight Grammy Awards, winning twice for Best Reggae Album with Boombastic in 1996 and 44/876 with Sting in 2019, and has won the Brit Award for International Male Solo Artist in 2002.

In 2007, he was awarded the Jamaican Order of Distinction with the rank of Commander. In 2022, he was awarded an honorary Doctor of Fine Arts degree from Brown University.

== Early life ==
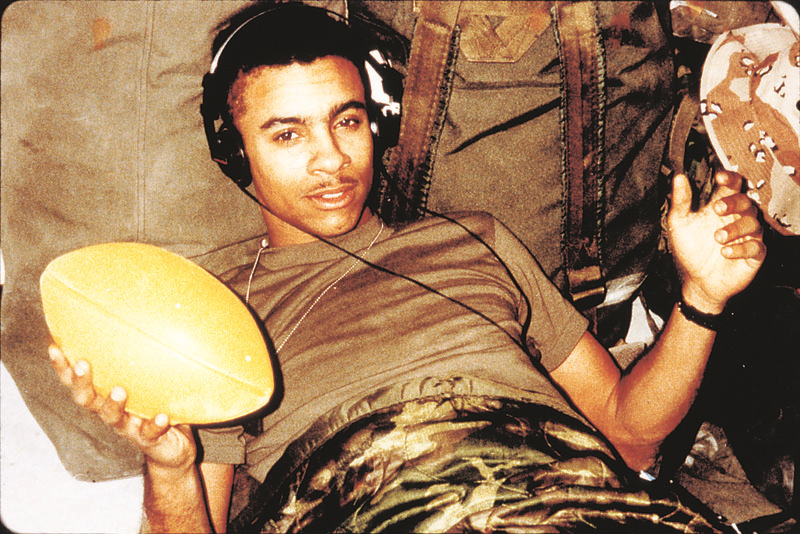
Shaggy during his military service with the United States Marine Corps.

Orville Richard Burrell was born on October 22, 1968, in Kingston. At the age of 18, he moved to New York City with his mother.

Burrell enlisted in the United States Marine Corps on April 12, 1988 and obtained the MOS 0811 (Field Artillery Cannon Crewman). He served with a Field Artillery Battery in the 10th Marine Regiment during the Persian Gulf War. Discharged on May 4, 1992, the highest rank he achieved was Lance Corporal, although he was reduced in rank twice. Burrell perfected his signature "toasting" voice while he was in the Marine Corps.

== Career ==
=== 1990s ===
Shaggy decided to pursue his music career and his first hit in 1993, "Oh Carolina", was a dancehall remake of a ska hit by the Folkes Brothers, which appeared in the film Sliver. The same year, Shaggy appeared on Kenny Dope's hip hop album The Unreleased Project. He worked together with producers such as Sting International, Don One, Lloyd 'Spiderman' Campbell, Robert Livingston and Frankie Cutlass on the Maxi-Single title "Nice and Lovely" Hip Hop Remix. He had further big hits, including "Boombastic" in 1995, the theme tune of a popular Levi's commercial, and sang with Maxi Priest on his Top 20 hit from 1996, "That Girl".

=== Hot Shot (2000) ===
In 1999, Shaggy was dropped by Virgin, who felt he was unlikely to release another song as successful as 1995's "Boombastic". He would sign with MCA Records to release the album Hot Shot, the following year. The album featured the smash hit singles "It Wasn't Me" and "Angel", the latter of which was built around two song samples – Chip Taylor's song "Angel of the Morning" (which released by Merrilee Rush in 1968 and covered in 1981 by Juice Newton), and The Steve Miller Band's 1973 hit "The Joker". Both songs topped the Billboard Hot 100 and saw similar success worldwide, reaching number one in the UK, Ireland, and France, among others. Female artist Lady Saw (aka Marion Hall) did an answer record to It Wasn't Me ("Son of a Bit@h") that also saw chart action. Hot Shot debuted at number one on the Billboard 200, and would go on to be certified 8× platinum by the Recording Industry Association of America (RIAA), as well as achieving platinum or multi-platinum status in a number of other countries, and ranking as the second most successful album of 2001 on the Billboard Year-End charts.

In 2001 Shaggy was selected to perform with Rayvon and Rikrok at Michael Jackson's 30th anniversary, performing the songs "Angel" and "It Wasn't Me" from Hot Shot.

=== Further releases (2002–2009) ===
Over the course of his next two albums, Shaggy saw his popularity decline in the United States. In October 2002, Shaggy released his second album for MCA, Lucky Day. While the album went on to sell 352,000 copies in the United States and become certified Gold by the RIAA, it was considered a sales disappointment in contrast to those of Hot Shot. MCA, who had been banking on the album's success to get the label through a poor financial year, subsequently went under, and was absorbed into sister label Geffen Records in July 2003. Shaggy's only album on Geffen, 2005's Clothes Drop, was even less of a success, only selling 40,000 copies, and he parted ways with the label the following year.

Despite this, both albums were more successful internationally. Lucky Day was more successful in Europe, especially with heavy airplay for the single "Hey Sexy Lady". Shaggy re-made the Scooby-Doo theme song on the soundtrack titled "Shaggy, Where Are You?" Shaggy also recorded the theme for the 2002 movie Showtime. Shaggy's last top 40 single in the United States was "Angel" from the album Hot Shot. On March 11, 2002, Shaggy and Ali G released "Me Julie" from the soundtrack to the film Ali G Indahouse. The song sold 300,000 copies in the United Kingdom, as stated by the Official Charts Company. It spent 14 weeks on the UK Singles Chart, peaking at number two.

Shaggy was featured on the album True Love by Toots and the Maytals, which won the Grammy Award in 2004 for Best Reggae Album, and showcased many notable musicians including Willie Nelson, Eric Clapton, Jeff Beck, Trey Anastasio, Gwen Stefani / No Doubt, Ben Harper, Bonnie Raitt, Manu Chao, The Roots, Ryan Adams, Keith Richards, Toots Hibbert, Paul Douglas, Jackie Jackson, Ken Boothe, and The Skatalites.

Following the release of Clothes Drop, Shaggy began to increase his number of live performances. In 2006, he was a featured artist on Japanese-American singer Ai's song "Famous" alongside Turkish singer Yalın from her album, What's Goin' On Ai. The trio performed "Famous" in Los Angeles in 2008. In March 2007, Shaggy performed the official song of the ICC Cricket World Cup 2007, titled "The Game of Love and Unity", alongside Bajan entertainer Rupee and Trinidadian soca artist Fay-Ann Lyons, at the opening ceremony of the tournament, held at The Greenfield Stadium, Trelawny, Jamaica. Later that year, he left Universal Music and released his latest album, Intoxication under his own label, Big Yard Records, with distribution rights by VP Records. In August 2007, he joined Cyndi Lauper live on stage in Singapore for the Sonnet Music Festival, where they performed "Girls Just Want to Have Fun" together. In October 2007, he was awarded the Jamaican Order of Distinction with the rank of Commander.

In January 2008, he completed a six-date arena tour with Belgian singer Natalia. He later performed with band En Vogue in Antwerp, to a crowd of 78,000 people. Shaggy also collaborated with Arash in the song "Donya" (Arabic & Persian: "دنیا", meaning "The World"). In April 2008, Shaggy was chosen to record the official anthem for the Mascots (Trix and Flix) of the Euro 2008 football tournament held in Austria and Switzerland. The song, "Feel the Rush", topped charts in most of Europe. In June 2008, a live DVD of his concert material was released under the name Shaggy – Live. In July 2008, he appeared on VH1's "I Love the New Millennium", talking about his video "It Wasn't Me". In August 2008, he performed live at the Dar es Salaam festival, to mark the Zain Global Brand launch in Tanzania. The concert was held at the Leaders Club. In December 2008, Intoxication was nominated for Best Reggae Album at the 51st Grammy Awards.

In May 2009, Shaggy performed at the closing ceremony of the 2009 IPL tournament held in South Africa. He also performed at the opening ceremony of the inaugural Champions League Twenty20 in the same month, held in Bangalore, India. In August 2009, he performed live at the Ottawa Reggae Festival in Ottawa, Ontario, Canada. Here he revealed plans for a new single, "Fading Away", which featured Kevin Rudolf and Lil Jon. He later cancelled this release in favour of "Fly High", a track featuring Gary Pine, which was released on December 5. Shaggy was also invited to perform at the Festival Creole, a festival held every year from November 28 to December 6 in Mauritius.

=== 2010s ===
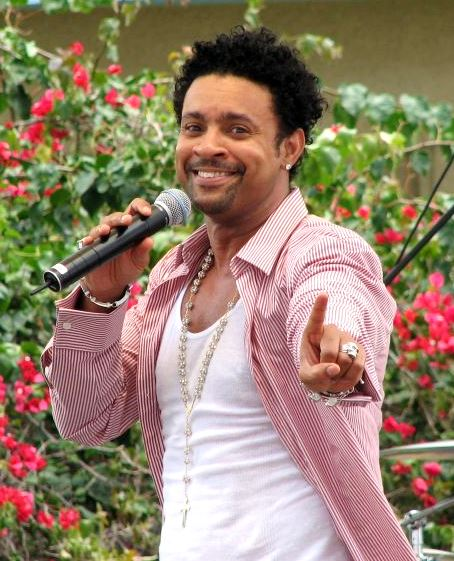
Shaggy in 2006

In January 2010, "Rise Again", a track featuring Sean Paul, Sean Kingston, Alison Hinds, Shontelle Layne, Edwin Yearwood, Destra Garcia, David Rudder, Kees Dieffenthaller, Tessanne Chin, Etana and Belo was released to support victims of the 2010 Haiti earthquake that struck on January 12. Shaggy's collaboration with the Balkan group Sahara (consisting of the Romanian singer Costi Ioniţă and the Bulgarian singer Andrea) and French House DJ Bob Sinclar on a track entitled "I Wanna" was a commercial success, released as a single in March 2010 throughout Europe. Shaggy later performed the track several times during Miami's Winter Music Conference in April 2010. In May 2010 he once again performed before cricket audiences at the ICC T20 World Championships, also providing between play performances.

On July 17, 2010, he performed at the Party FM Meja Jam Concert in Country Fair Entertainment Park, Medford, New York. Later that month, he recorded the song "Target" with Japanese reggae singer lecca, which was released on her album, パワーバタフライ (Power Butterfly). Shaggy also released "For Your Eyez Only", which topped reggae charts across the world. Shaggy recorded the song with fellow Jamaican singer Alaine.

In 2011, Shaggy released the official videos for "For Your Eyez Only", along with the hit singles "Sweet Jamaica", featuring Mr. Vegas and Josie Wales, and "Girlz Dem Luv We" featuring Mavado. That same year it was announced that Shaggy would release his first new album in four years. Preceded by the single "Champagne", featuring Sahara, the album was released digitally on January 19, 2011. Titled Shaggy & Friends, the album featured many collaborations, including songs with his long-time collaborators Rikrok and Rayvon. A physical release of the album followed. On July 16, 2011, he launched the album Summer in Kingston which contained his single "Sugarcane". The album was launched at a free party in Kingston, Jamaica, where he released the video for "Sugarcane". The video was premiered globally on MTV. "Sugarcane" went on to become the number-two best-selling reggae song on the Canadian iTunes chart, and number four in the United States. Shaggy also collaborated with Apache Indian on the latter's album Home Run, on a remix of "Chokthere".

On January 7, 2012, Shaggy released a collaborative single with Egyptian star Tamer Hosny, "Smile", with a music video filmed in New York City. In February 2012, he re-released his EP, Summer in Kingston, in the form of the Lava Edition, containing two new tracks, one of which was taken from his upcoming Sly & Robbie & Shaggy project, plus a remix of the track "Dame" featuring Kat Deluna.

On April 5, 2012, Shaggy released the lead single from his eleventh studio album, Rise. The track, "World Citizen", is a collaboration with European folk singer Jahcoustix, and was a hit all over Europe. Shaggy launched his own label, Ranch Entertainment, on June 4, 2012, at a press launch in New York City. He was joined by label mates Rayvon and Red Fox for the launch, which was publicized by Manhattan-based PR firm, Fox Fuse and publicist Rhona Fox. Ranch Entertainment is based in New York and Jamaica.

On August 24, Shaggy released his new single, "Girls Just Wanna Have Fun", featuring American female rapper Eve. The song samples the homonymous 1983 hit song by Cyndi Lauper, written by Robert Hazard in 1979 and recorded and released by Lauper in 1983. The video for the song was directed by Ras Kassa and released on YouTube on June 14, 2012.

On September 28, Shaggy released Rise across Europe. The album contains nine of the ten tracks from Summer in Kingston, as well as new tracks "Rise", "Girls Just Wanna Have Fun" (the second single), "Diva", "World Citizen" (the first single) and "Get Back My Baby", as well as his single from three years previously, "Fly High".

Shaggy confirmed in January 2012 that he is working on a new studio album, where all of the tracks will be produced by production duo Sly and Robbie. A taster track from the album, "Make Up", featuring Wayne Wonder, was released in July 2012, while one of the tracks, "She Gives Me Love", was released early on the Lava edition of Summer in Kingston. In December 2012, Shaggy confirmed that the album would be released in the summer of 2013. On May 14, 2013, Shaggy released the lead single from the album, entitled "Fight This Feeling", featuring Beres Hammond. Shaggy started the year with his first live presentation in Costa Rica on January 20.

Shaggy is credited for persuading Tessanne Chin to compete in NBC's singing competition The Voice, which she ultimately won.

In 2015, his single "Habibi (I Need Your Love)", featuring Mohombi, Faydee and Costi peaked at 66 on the Billboard Hot 100, as well as charting in several international territories. Shaggy then featured on the track "Black and White", from Kylie Minogue and Fernando Garibay's EP, Kylie + Garibay.

Also in 2015, Shaggy was featured on Farruko's "Sunset" alongside Nicky Jam.

In 2016, he collaborated with French singer Mylène Farmer on "City of Love".

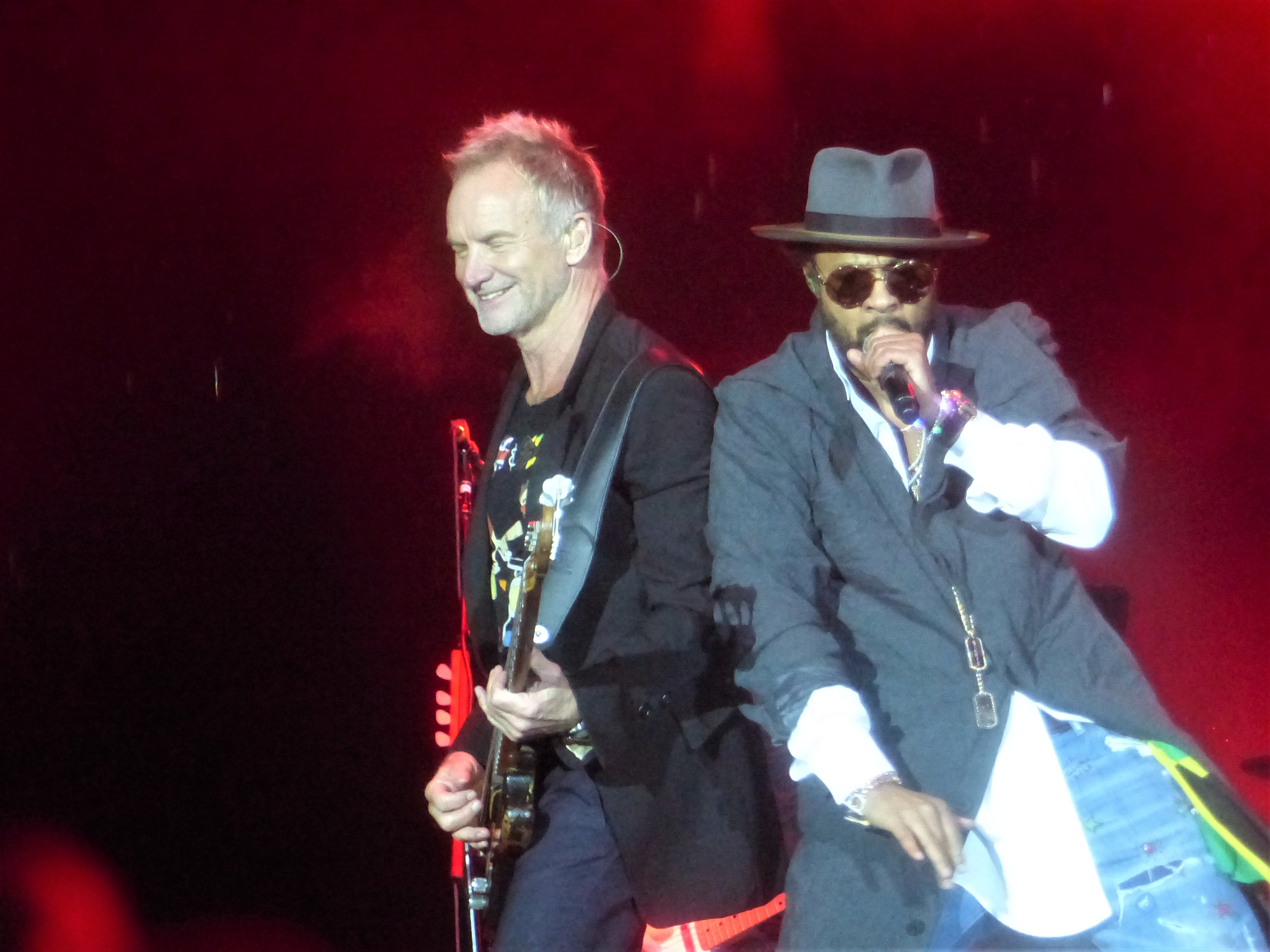
Sting and Shaggy on tour

January 2018 saw the release of "Don't Make Me Wait", the first single from a collaboration album with Sting, who invited him to tour along. The album, titled 44/876, was released on April 20, 2018. In March 2018, the single "Why", featuring Massari, was released.

In November 2018, Shaggy featured on the title track of Olly Murs' sixth album You Know I Know. In May 2019, Shaggy's album Wah Gwaan?! was released.

In August 2019, it was announced that Shaggy, alongside Sean Paul, would be headlining the One Love Festival In Queensland slated for February 1, 2020, the first time the festival would be held in Australia.

In November 2019, Shaggy played Sebastian in musical television special The Little Mermaid Live! on ABC. Also, In 2019, Shaggy collaborated with Indian singer Mika Singh on the latter's track "Belly ring".

=== 2020s ===
In January 2020, Shaggy told the Daily Star in an interview that some of Rihanna's representatives had reached out to him to collaborate on a song for her ninth album. However, he turned down the opportunity because he was asked to audition, saying that he would "leave that to the younger guys". Shaggy later stated in another interview that he meant no offence by his remarks. Despite passing on the project, he seemed optimistic about how it would turn out, saying: "From what I hear, it should be good."

In April 2020, Shaggy celebrated the 20th anniversary of his 2000 album Hot Shot by announcing an updated version of the album, called Hot Shot 2020. "It Wasn't Me" returned as the first single on the updated album with Rayvon. His original collaborator on the song, Rikrok, does not appear on the new version.

Shaggy, Spice and Sean Paul collaborated on "Go Down Deh", which became a dancehall hit during the summer of 2021. The three went on a tour of American and British television performances in June and July of that year, appearing on shows such as Good Morning America, Jimmy Kimmel Live, The Wendy Williams Show and Good Morning Britain.

In 2022, Shaggy competed in season seven of The Masked Singer as "Space Bunny" of Team Cuddly. He was eliminated alongside En Vogue as the "Queen Cobras" of Team Bad.

On May 28, 2022, Shaggy was conferred with an Honorary Doctor of Fine Arts degree from Brown University.

In 2024, Shaggy's 2001 hit "Angel," featuring Rayvon, was certified Platinum by the British Phonographic Industry (BPI) for achieving over 600,000 sales and streams in the United Kingdom, as tracked by the Official Charts Company.

From 2025 to 2026, he took on the role of the Ferryman in a new production of Sting's musical The Last Ship, which toured to New York, Paris, Amsterdam and Brisbane.

In May 2026, Shaggy released his studio album Lottery via VP Music Group and Ranch Entertainment. The 13-track project marked his first album of original, non-holiday material in several years and features collaborations with artists including Jeremih, Robin Thicke, Dexta Daps, Sting, and Anthony Hamilton.

In June 2026, Shaggy was included on the Official FIFA World Cup 2026 Album with the song “Love Always Wins”, a collaboration with Cimafunk and Zema. The track formed part of the official music rollout for the 2026 FIFA World Cup.

== Personal life ==
Burrell married his long-term partner Rebecca Packer in 2014 and together they have three daughters. Burrell has two sons from a previous relationship. His son Richard O'Neil Burrell is an American rapper known as Robb Banks.

In 2022, he received an honorary Doctor of Fine Arts degree from Brown University.

=== Philanthropy ===
Shaggy started his philanthropy with a project called Shaggy and Friends, in 2016, donating more than US$1 million, to the Bustamante Children's Hospital in Jamaica. Along with financial assistance to the hospital, he has donated hospital equipment and machinery. He also did his first collaboration in the Caribbean called "Can't Let My Love Go", which he performed with the "Queen of Soca" Alison Hinds of Barbados.

In May 2020, during the COVID-19 pandemic, Shaggy performed a Billboard Live At-Home concert that raised funds for Direct Relief, entertaining fans while supporting COVID-19 relief efforts.

In December 2025, Shaggy co-headlined a benefit concert to raise funds for Hurricane Melissa relief efforts in Jamaica.

== Discography ==
=== Studio albums ===
- Pure Pleasure (1993)
- Original Doberman (1994)
- Boombastic (1995)
- Midnite Lover (1997)
- Hot Shot (2000)
- Lucky Day (2002)
- Clothes Drop (2005)
- Intoxication (2007)
- Shaggy & Friends (2011)
- Summer in Kingston (2011)
- Rise (2012)
- Out of Many, One Music (2013)
- Wah Gwaan?! (2019)
- Christmas in the Islands (2020)
- Com Fly Wid Mi (2022)
- Lottery (2026)

=== Collaborative albums ===
- 44/876 (with Sting) (2018)

== Tours ==
=== Concert tours ===
- Pure Pleasure Tour (1993–94)
- Crazy Cool/Boombastic Tour (with Paula Abdul) (1995–96)
- Midnite Lover Tour (1997–98)
- Saint Lucia Arts & Jazz Festival (with Sting) (2023)
- Hot Summer Nights 2023 Tour (with TLC, En Vogue, and Sean Kingston) (2023)

== Filmography ==
Year	Title	Role	Notes
1997	Never Mind the Buzzcocks	Self	Episode 02x01
2004	Blast	Mace	
2006	Barnyard	Biggie Cheese	Archival recordings taken from Boombastic
2018	Game Over, Man!	Himself	
2019	American Idol	Himself	
2019	The Little Mermaid Live!	Sebastian	
2020	The Bachelor Presents: Listen to Your Heart	Himself	
2022	The Masked Singer	Space Bunny/Himself	Season 7 contestant
2022	Never Mind the Buzzcocks	Self	Episode 30x04
2023	American Dad!	Himself (voice)	Episode: "Multiverse of American Dadness"

=== Stage credits ===
Year	Title	Role
2025–2026	The Last Ship	The Ferryman

== Awards and nominations ==
=== Grammy Awards ===
Year	Nominated work	Award	Result
1996	Boombastic	Best Reggae Album	Won
2002	"It Wasn't Me" featuring Rikrok	Best Pop Collaboration with Vocal	Nominated
2006	Clothes Drop	Best Reggae Album	Nominated
2008	Intoxication	Best Reggae Album	Nominated
2012	Summer in Kingston	Best Reggae Album	Nominated
2015	Out of Many, One Music	Best Reggae Album	Nominated
2019	44/876	Best Reggae Album	Won
2023	Com Fly Wid Mi	Best Reggae Album	Nominated

=== American Music Awards ===
Year	Nominated work	Award	Result
2002	Shaggy	Favorite Male Pop/Rock Artist	Nominated
2002	Shaggy	Favorite Rap/Hip-Hop Artist	Nominated
2002	Shaggy	Internet Fans Award	Nominated

=== Billboard Music Awards ===
Year	Nominated work	Award	Result
2001	Shaggy	Male Artist of the Year	Won
2001	Shaggy	Male Albums Artist of the Year	Won

=== Juno Awards ===
Year	Nominated work	Award	Result
2002	Hot Shot	International Album of the Year	Won
