= Intoxication (Shaggy album) =

Studio album by Shaggy
- Released: 22 October 2007
- Recorded: 2006–2007
- Studios: Big Yard Studios (New York); Ranch Studio (New York); Jungle Studio (Jamaica); The House (Florida); Judgement Yard Studio (Jamaica); Circle House Studios (Florida)
- Genres: Reggae; dancehall; R&B
- Length: 50:57
- Label: VP
- Producers: Christopher "Longman" Birch; Dwayne Shippy; Goldenchyl; Robert Livingston; Sting International; Tony "CD" Kelly

Shaggy chronology
Clothes Drop (2005)	Intoxication (2007)	The Best of Shaggy (2008)

Singles from Intoxication
- 1. "Church Heathen" Released: 22 August 2007; 2. "Bonafide Girl" Released: 11 March 2008; 3. "Feel the Rush" Released: 2 June 2008; 4. "What's Love" Released: 14 November 2008

Intoxication is the eighth studio album by Jamaican rapper Shaggy. It was released on 22 October 2007 through VP Records. Recording sessions took place at Big Yard Studios and Ranch Studio in New York, Jungle Studio and Judgement Yard Studio in Jamaica, The House and Circle House Studios in Florida. Production was handled by Sting Int'l, Tony "CD" Kelly, Christopher "Longman" Birch, Robert Livingston, Dwayne Shippy and Goldenchyl. It features guest appearances from Na'sha, Akon, Collie Buddz, Mischieve, Rayvon, Rik Rok, Sizzla and Tony Gold.

The album did not received major chart success, only reaching number 82 in France, number 95 in Switzerland, number 30 on the UK Independent Albums and atop of the US Billboard Reggae Albums charts. It was re-issued in September 2008 to include additional tracks, remixes and music videos. Four singles were released from the album: "Church Heathen", "Bonafide Girl", "Feel the Rush", the official single for UEFA Euro 2008 (which only appears on the subsequent re-issue of the album) and "What's Love".

== Critical reception ==
Professional ratings
Aggregate scores
Source	Rating
Metacritic	76/100
Review scores
Source	Rating
AllMusic	4/5 stars
Entertainment Weekly	B
Now	2/5 Ns
The Phoenix	3/4 stars

Intoxication was met with generally favourable reviews from music critics. At Metacritic, which assigns a normalized rating out of 100 to reviews from mainstream publications, the album received an average score of 76 based on seven reviews.

AllMusic's David Jeffries praised the album, stating: "with Intoxication, Shaggy has once again found that perfect balance of slick and streetwise, and added career-defining single number three as the cherry on top". Leah Greenblatt of Entertainment Weekly found it "his best tune is an amigo-free one--the spare, glitchy title track. Gotta give the old dog credit for new tricks". Ben Westhoff of The Boston Phoenix wrote: "from 'Intoxication' (a tale of sexual regret) to 'Church Heathen' (about hypocrisy in the church), the lyrics are more stimulating than your typical dancehall fare, and the beats are elegant and catchy".

In mixed reviews, Now contributor found "his intentions sound pure, but Shaggy's musical moonshine will leave all but the biggest fans with a heavy hangover".

== Track listing ==
No.	Title	Writer(s)	Producer(s)	Length
1.	"Can't Hold Me"	Orville Burrell; Robert Livingston; Rickardo Ducent; Andre Fennell	Robert Livingston	2:37
2.	"Bonafide Girl" (featuring Rik Rok and Tony Gold)	Burrell; Ducent; Patrick Morrison; Shaun Pizzonia; Desmond Dekker	Sting International	3:36
3.	"Intoxication"	Burrell; Dwayne Shippy; Fennell	Goldenchyl	3:31
4.	"Those Days" (featuring Na'sha)	Burrell; Christopher Birch; Eugene Raskin	Longman	3:22
5.	"More Woman"	Burrell; Anthony Kelly; Fennell	Tony "CD" Kelly	3:38
6.	"Woman Scorn" (featuring Na'sha)	Burrell; Ducent; Birch	Longman	3:12
7.	"Mad, Mad World" (featuring Sizzla and Collie Buddz)	Burrell; Ducent; Miguel Collins; Colin Harper; Birch	Longman	3:50
8.	"Out of Control" (featuring Rayvon)	Burrell; Bruce Brewster; Shippy; Pizzonia	Sting International	3:26
9.	"Church Heathen"	Burrell; Kelly; Ducent; Fennell; Birch; Pizzonia; Maurice Gregory	Tony "CD" Kelly; Sting International	4:06
10.	"Wear Di Crown" (featuring Mischieve)	Burrell; Sandra Houghton; Shippy; Livingston	Robert Livingston	2:29
11.	"Criteria"	Burrell; Kelly; Gregory	Tony "CD" Kelly; Sting International	3:42
12.	"Body a Shake"	Burrell; Shippy; Livingston	Robert Livingston	3:17
13.	"What's Love" (featuring Akon)	Burrell; Kelly; Ducent; Gregory	Tony "CD" Kelly	3:06
14.	"Holla at You"	Burrell; Shippy	Dwayne Shippy	3:28
15.	"All About Love"	Burrell; Kelly; Gregory; M. Darson; Richard Browne	Tony "CD" Kelly; Sting International	3:37
Total length:				50:57

European bonus track
No.	Title	Writer(s)	Producer(s)	Length
16.	"Reggae Vibes"	Burrell; Derrick Harriott	Robert Livingston	2:57

Japanese bonus tracks
No.	Title	Writer(s)	Length
16.	"Wrong Move"	Burrell; Kelly	3:03
17.	"Reggae Vibes"	Burrell; Harriott	2:57

iTunes Store deluxe edition bonus tracks
No.	Title	Writer(s)	Length
16.	"Reggae Vibes"	Burrell; Harriott	2:57
17.	"Feel the Rush" (featuring Trix & Flix)	Burrell; Fennell; Marc Fritsch; Andreas Litterscheid; Luis Enrique Martínez Argote; Esteban Montaño Polo; Hugo Oscar; Andres Paz Barros; Reinhard Raith; Samim Winiger	3:23
18.	"Like a Superstar" (featuring Trix & Flix)	Burrell; Heikki Johannes Liimatainen; Lasse Mellberg; Jaakko Sakari Salovaara	3:04

Special physical re-issue edition bonus tracks
No.	Title	Writer(s)	Length
16.	"Feel the Rush" (featuring Trix & Flix)	Burrell; Fennell; Fritsch; Litterscheid; Argote; Polo; Oscar; Barros; Raith; Winiger	3:23
17.	"Reggae Vibes"	Burrell; Harriott	2:57
18.	"It Wasn't Me" (featuring Rik Rok)	Burrell; Ducent; Pizzonia; Brian Thompson	3:17
19.	"What's Love (New Radio Edit)" (featuring Akon)	Burrell; Ducent; Gregory; Kelly	3:57
20.	"Feel the Rush" (Music video)
21.	"What's Love" (Music video)

Special digital re-issue edition bonus tracks
No.	Title	Writer(s)	Length
16.	"Feel the Rush" (featuring Trix & Flix)	Burrell; Fennell; Fritsch; Litterscheid; Argote; Polo; Oscar; Barros; Raith; Winiger	3:23
17.	"Who a Wear Di Jacket"	Burrell; Shippy; Livingston	3:14
18.	"A Nuh You a Nuh Me"	Burrell; Desmond John Ballentine; Livingston; Fennell	3:33
19.	"Can't Take My Flava"	Burrell; Pizzonia	3:04

Sample credits

- Song "Bonafide Girl" contains an interpolation from "007 (Shanty Town)" written by Desmond Dekker.
- Song "Those Days" contains an interpolation of "Those Were the Days" written by Gene Raskin.
- Song "Reggae Vibes" contains a sample taken from "That Man" performed by Derrick Harriott.

== Charts ==
Chart (2007)	Peak position
French Albums (SNEP)	82
Swiss Albums (Schweizer Hitparade)	95
UK Independent Albums (Official Charts)	30
US Reggae Albums (Billboard)	1
