= List of Billboard Hot 100 number ones of 2001 =

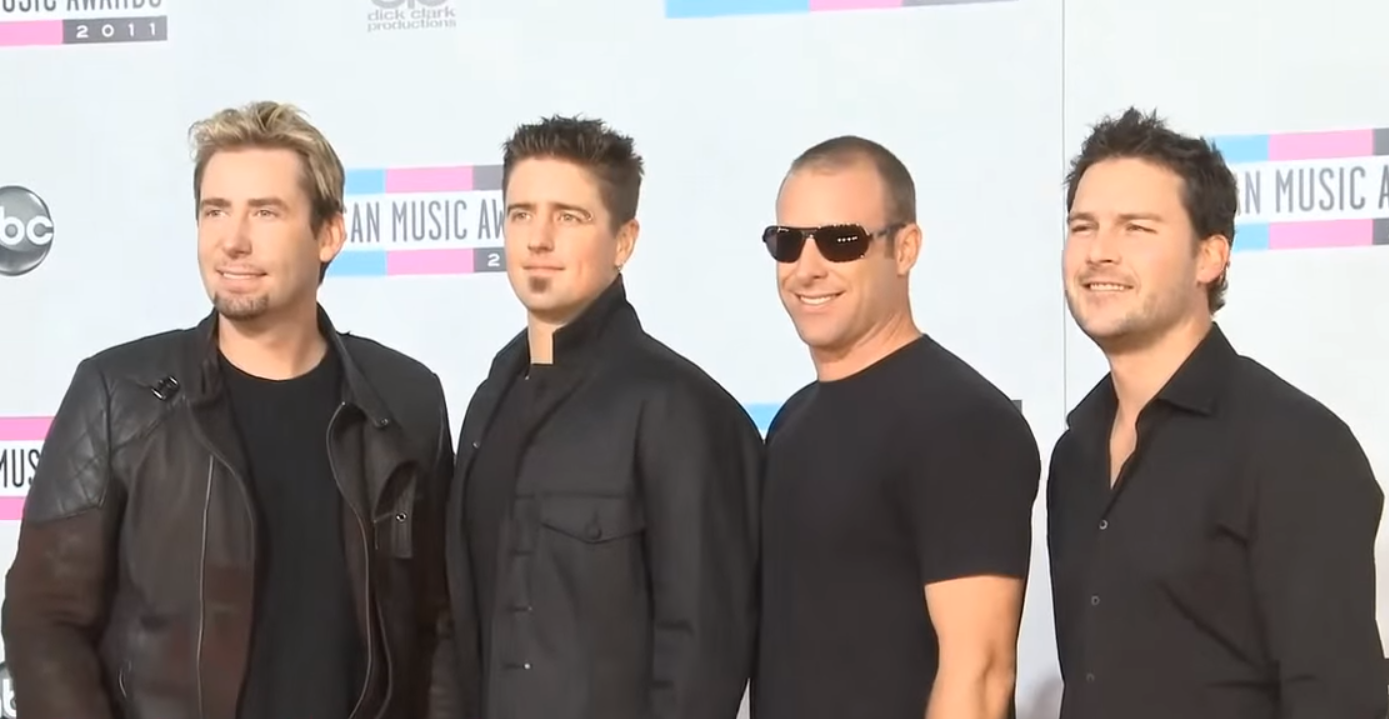
Canadian rock band Nickelback earned their first and only number one single with "How You Remind Me". It went on to be the best-charting song of 2002.

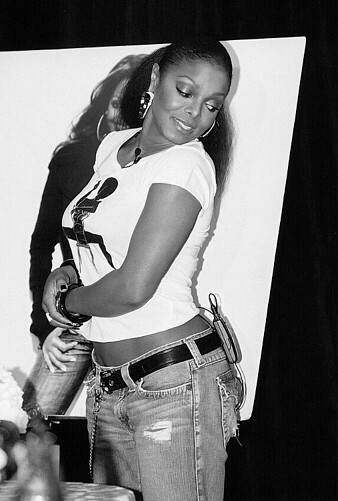
Janet Jackson's "All for You" was the longest-running single of 2001, topping the Hot 100 for seven consecutive weeks.

The Billboard Hot 100 is a chart that ranks the best-performing singles of the United States. Published by Billboard magazine, the data are compiled by Nielsen SoundScan based collectively on each single's weekly physical sales, and airplay. In 2001, there were 14 singles that topped the chart, in 52 issue dates. Although 15 singles claimed the top position throughout the year, group Destiny's Child's "Independent Women Part I" is credited in 2000, and is thus excluded.

During the year, 12 acts had achieved a first U.S. number-one single, namely: Shaggy, Ricardo "RikRok" Ducent, OutKast, Mystikal, Crazy Town, Rayvon, Lil' Kim, Mýa, Pink, Alicia Keys, Ja Rule, Mary J. Blige, and Nickelback. Destiny's Child, Usher and Shaggy had two number-one singles in 2001.

Janet Jackson's "All for You" is the longest-running single of the year, staying at number one for seven consecutive weeks. 2001 is the first year since 1993 that there has not been at least one number-one hit with a double-digit run. "All for You" is also responsible to give to Jackson the tenth Hot 100 number one of her career; making her the fourth female artist with most number ones in the rock era. Other singles that had a multiple chart run includes Alicia Keys' "Fallin'" and Mary J. Blige's "Family Affair"; both stayed atop for six weeks.

== Chart history ==
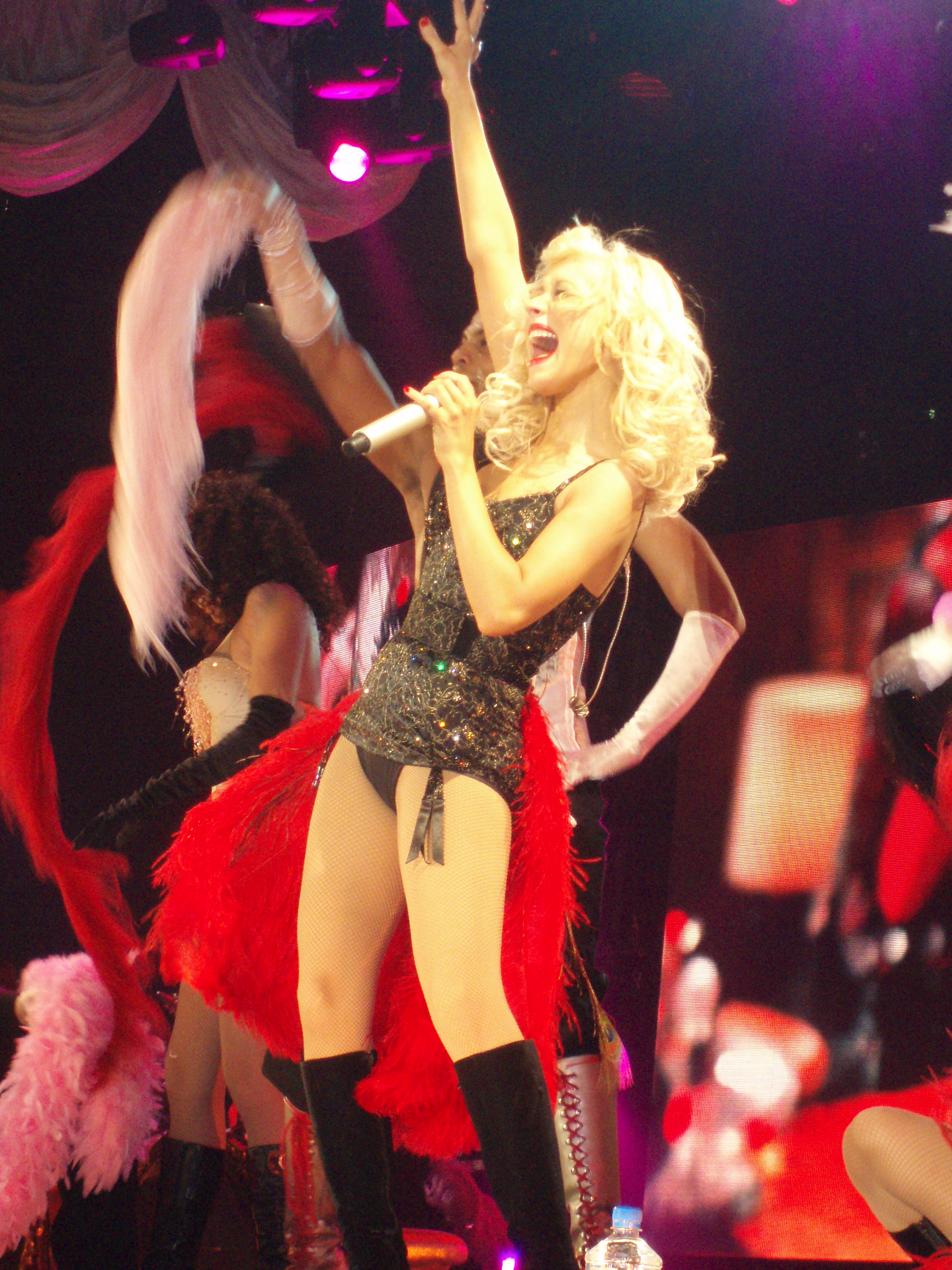
Pop singer Christina Aguilera gained her fourth number one single in the U.S. with a cover version of "Lady Marmalade", and stayed at the top with her collaborators Mýa, Pink, and Lil' Kim for five consecutive weeks.

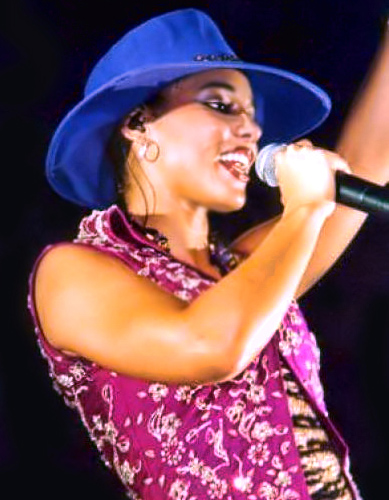
R&B singer Alicia Keys earned her first number one Single "Fallin'" in U.S. and stayed at the top for six nonconsecutive weeks.

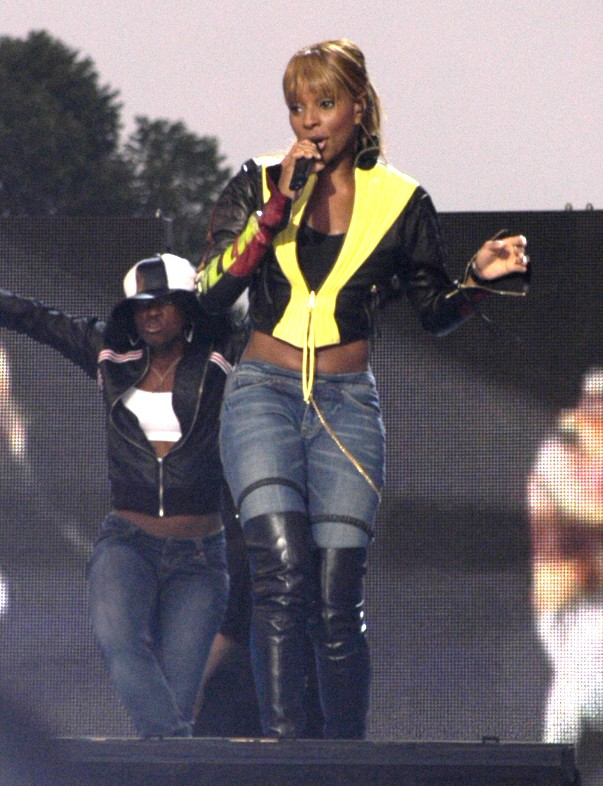
R&B singer Mary J. Blige gained her first number one single "Family Affair" in U.S. and stayed at the top for six consecutive weeks.

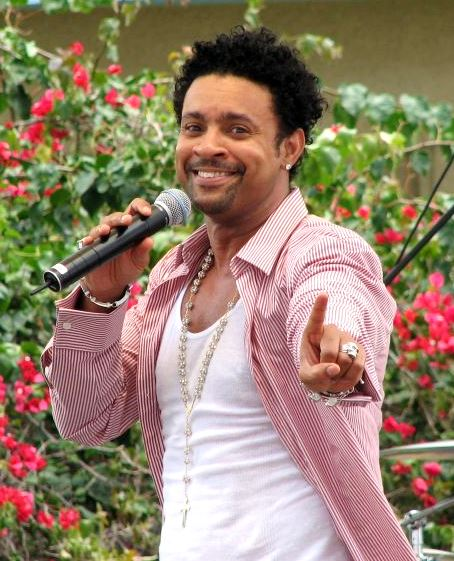
Jamaican reggae singer Shaggy earned his first and second number one singles "It Wasn't Me" and "Angel" in U.S. and stayed at the top for two consecutive weeks and one week respectively.

Key
The #1 song of 2001, "Hanging by a Moment" by Lifehouse, never reached #1 on the weekly charts.

No.	Issue date	Song	Artist(s)	Ref.
867	January 6	"Independent Women"	Destiny's Child	
867	January 13	"Independent Women"	Destiny's Child	
867	January 20	"Independent Women"	Destiny's Child	
867	January 27	"Independent Women"	Destiny's Child	
868	February 3	"It Wasn't Me"	Shaggy featuring Ricardo "RikRok" Ducent	
868	February 10	"It Wasn't Me"	Shaggy featuring Ricardo "RikRok" Ducent	
869	February 17	"Ms. Jackson"	OutKast	
870	February 24	"Stutter"	Joe featuring Mystikal	
870	March 3	"Stutter"	Joe featuring Mystikal	
870	March 10	"Stutter"	Joe featuring Mystikal	
870	March 17	"Stutter"	Joe featuring Mystikal	
871	March 24	"Butterfly"	Crazy Town	
872	March 31	"Angel"	Shaggy featuring Rayvon	
re	April 7	"Butterfly"	Crazy Town	
873	April 14	"All for You"	Janet	
873	April 21	"All for You"	Janet	
873	April 28	"All for You"	Janet	
873	May 5	"All for You"	Janet	
873	May 12	"All for You"	Janet	
873	May 19	"All for You"	Janet	
873	May 26	"All for You"	Janet	
874	June 2	"Lady Marmalade"	Christina Aguilera, Lil' Kim, Mýa and Pink	
874	June 9	"Lady Marmalade"	Christina Aguilera, Lil' Kim, Mýa and Pink	
874	June 16	"Lady Marmalade"	Christina Aguilera, Lil' Kim, Mýa and Pink	
874	June 23	"Lady Marmalade"	Christina Aguilera, Lil' Kim, Mýa and Pink	
874	June 30	"Lady Marmalade"	Christina Aguilera, Lil' Kim, Mýa and Pink	
875	July 7	"U Remind Me"	Usher	
875	July 14	"U Remind Me"	Usher	
875	July 21	"U Remind Me"	Usher	
875	July 28	"U Remind Me"	Usher	
876	August 4	"Bootylicious"	Destiny's Child	
876	August 11	"Bootylicious"	Destiny's Child	
877	August 18	"Fallin'"	Alicia Keys	
877	August 25	"Fallin'"	Alicia Keys	
877	September 1	"Fallin'"	Alicia Keys	
878	September 8	"I'm Real (Murder Remix)"	Jennifer Lopez featuring Ja Rule	
878	September 15	"I'm Real (Murder Remix)"	Jennifer Lopez featuring Ja Rule	
878	September 22	"I'm Real (Murder Remix)"	Jennifer Lopez featuring Ja Rule	
re	September 29	"Fallin'"	Alicia Keys	
re	October 6	"Fallin'"	Alicia Keys	
re	October 13	"Fallin'"	Alicia Keys	
re	October 20	"I'm Real (Murder Remix)"	Jennifer Lopez featuring Ja Rule	
re	October 27	"I'm Real (Murder Remix)"	Jennifer Lopez featuring Ja Rule	
879	November 3	"Family Affair"	Mary J. Blige	
879	November 10	"Family Affair"	Mary J. Blige	
879	November 17	"Family Affair"	Mary J. Blige	
879	November 24	"Family Affair"	Mary J. Blige	
879	December 1	"Family Affair"	Mary J. Blige	
879	December 8	"Family Affair"	Mary J. Blige	
880	December 15	"U Got It Bad"	Usher	
881	December 22	"How You Remind Me"	Nickelback	
881	December 29	"How You Remind Me"	Nickelback	

== Number-one artists ==
List of number-one artists by total weeks at number one
Position	Artist	Weeks at No. 1
1	Janet	7
2	Destiny's Child	6
2	Alicia Keys	6
2	Mary J. Blige	6
5	Christina Aguilera	5
5	Lil' Kim	5
5	Mýa	5
5	Pink	5
5	Jennifer Lopez	5
5	Ja Rule	5
5	Usher	5
12	Joe	4
12	Mystikal	4
14	Shaggy	3
15	Ricardo 'RikRok' Ducent	2
15	Crazy Town	2
15	Nickelback	2
18	OutKast	1
18	Rayvon	1

== See also ==
- 2001 in music
- List of Billboard number-one singles
- Billboard Year-End Hot 100 singles of 2001
- List of Billboard Hot 100 number-one singles of the 2000s

== Additional sources ==
- Fred Bronson's Billboard Book of Number 1 Hits, 5th Edition (ISBN 0-8230-7677-6)
- Joel Whitburn's Top Pop Singles 1955-2008, 12 Edition (ISBN 0-89820-180-2)
- Joel Whitburn Presents the Billboard Hot 100 Charts: The 2000s (ISBN 0-89820-182-9)
- Additional information obtained can be verified within Billboard's online archive services and print editions of the magazine.
