= Bonafide Girl =

Single by Shaggy featuring Rikrok and Tony Gold

from the album Intoxication
- B-side: "Who a Wear di Jacket?"
- Released: March 11, 2007
- Recorded: 2007
- Genre: Reggae fusion, reggae, pop, R&B
- Length: 3:36
- Label: VP Music Group/Canyon Records
- Songwriters: Burrell, Dekker, Ducent, Morrison, Pizzonia
- Producer: Burrell

Shaggy singles chronology
"Church Heathen" (2007)	"Bonafide Girl" (2007)	"What's Love" (2008)

Rikrok singles chronology
"My Love" (2007)	"Bonafide Girl" (2007)

"Bonafide Girl" is the second single from rapper Shaggy's seventh studio album, Intoxication. The song features guest vocals from Rikrok, who previously collaborated with Shaggy in 2000 for the single "It Wasn't Me", and Tony Gold. The single was released on March 11, 2007. The track samples "007 (Shanty Town)," by Desmond Dekker.

== Track listing ==
CD Single

1. "Bonafide Girl" (featuring Rikrok)
2. "Who a Wear di Jacket?"

== Charts ==
Chart (2008)	Peak position
German Singles Chart	71
