= Shaggy defense =

Denial with the defense "it wasn't me"

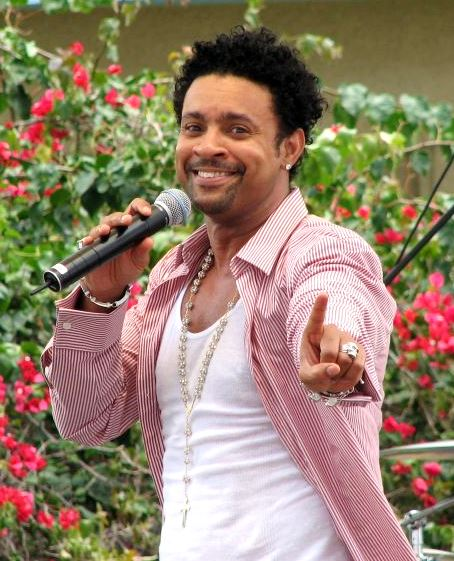
Shaggy performing in 2006

A Shaggy defense is an informal phrase used to describe a legal defense strategy in which the defendant categorically denies any accusations with the simple defense of "it wasn't me", despite overwhelming evidence to the contrary. The phrase is derived from reggae musician Shaggy's 2000 single "It Wasn't Me", and was coined by Slate writer Josh Levin in 2008 to describe the defense tactics used by singer R. Kelly while on trial for child pornography charges.

== Origin ==
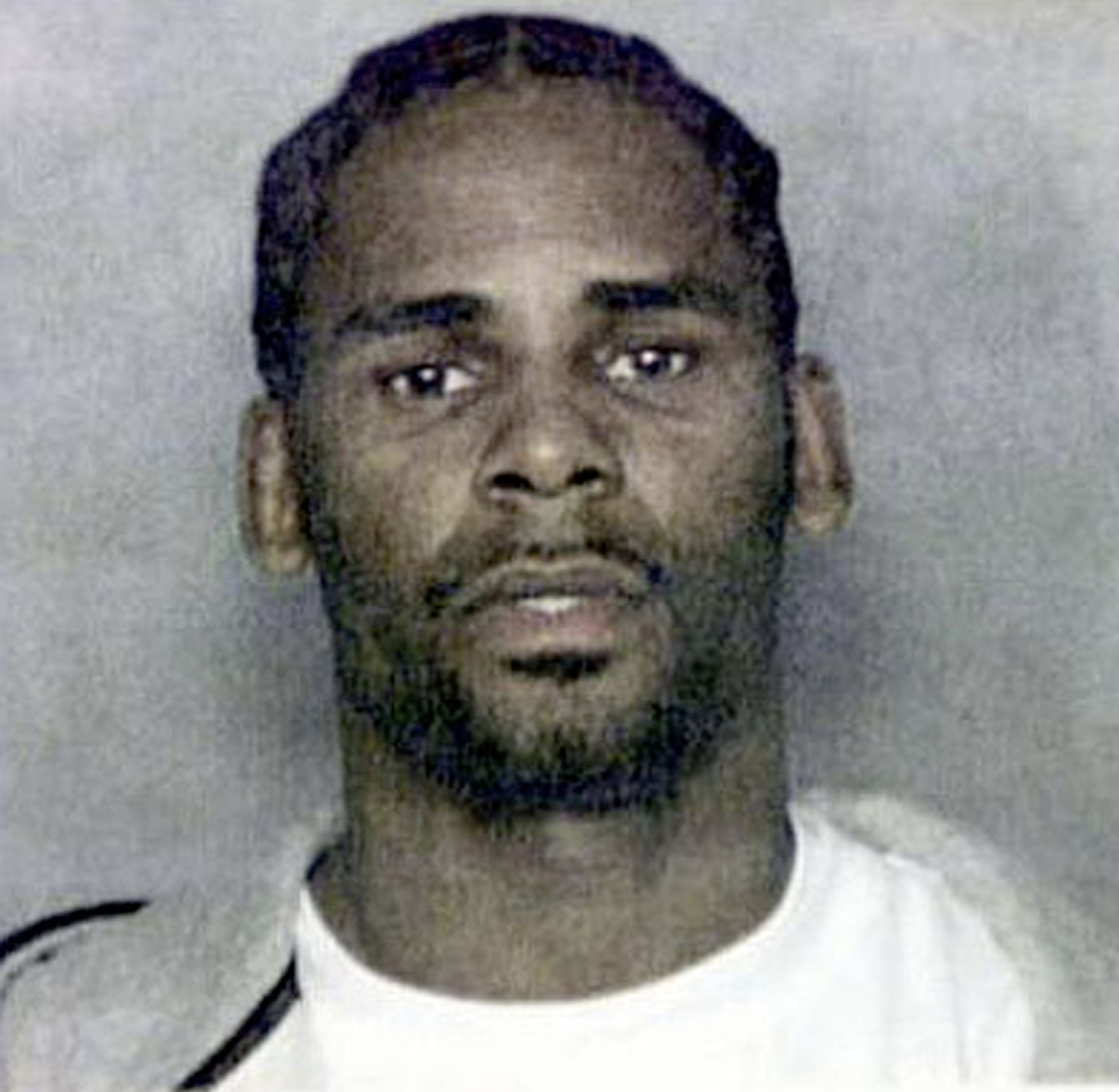
The term was coined in relation to a sex scandal involving musician R. Kelly (pictured around the time of the event).

"It Wasn't Me" by reggae musician Shaggy was released in September 2000 as the first single from his fifth album Hot Shot, eventually reaching number 1 on the Billboard Hot 100 in the United States and in other countries. The lyrics of the song depict a man asking his friend what to do after his girlfriend catches him having sex with another woman. His friend's advice is to deny everything, despite clear evidence to the contrary, with the phrase "It wasn't me".

On February 3, 2002, a video surfaced showing popular R&B musician R. Kelly raping and urinating on an underage girl. The story was sent to the Chicago Sun-Times on February 8, 2002. This news surfaced on the day Kelly was to perform at the opening ceremony of the 2002 Winter Olympics. In interviews with WMAQ television of Chicago and MTV News, Kelly said that he was not the man in the video. In June 2002, Kelly was indicted on 21 counts of child pornography and arrested.

The case earned media attention, and Kelly's insistence that he was not the man in the video as his only line of defense earned mockery. When the case went to trial in 2007, Kelly based his defense on denying that it was him in the video, which led Slate writer Josh Levin to coin the term the "Shaggy defense" in reference to the song to describe Kelly's strategy: "I predict that in the decades to come, law schools will teach this as the 'Shaggy defense'. You allege that I was caught on camera, butt naked, banging on the log cabin floor? It wasn't me." Levin repeated the term on NPR. Ultimately, Kelly was found not guilty on those charges.

According to Josh Levin of Slate, "As Kelly's lawyers mentioned multiple times, the alleged victim in this case – now a 23-year-old woman – told a grand jury that it wasn't her. While 15 friends and relatives testified that the girl in question was indeed on the video, neither the alleged victim nor her parents showed up in court to testify for either side." The prosecution witness Lisa Van Allen was easily impeached as a witness due to her clearly sordid history with R. Kelly, others, and even soliciting a bribe from an investigator in the case. One juror told the Chicago Tribune, "At some point we said there was a lack of evidence."

== Use ==
In the 2010 Virginia court case Preston v. Morton, in which an allegation against a driver accused of striking a man with a tractor trailer while he was installing traffic lights was refuted by the defendant claiming that he was not the one driving the truck in question, U.S. District Judge Jackson Kiser specifically cited the alleged driver as using the Shaggy defense in his written judgement. Writing about the case, Josh Levin noted the endurance of the term he coined: "The Shaggy defense, like the jury system and the principle of habeas corpus, is one of the pillars underpinning American jurisprudence."

Additionally in 2010, journalist Chris Hayes accused BP of using the Shaggy defense over their refusal to accept responsibility for the Deepwater Horizon oil spill.

In 2013, The Atlantic accused the United States Department of Justice of using the Shaggy defense in regards to their refusal to respond to a lawsuit filed against them by the American Civil Liberties Union over the CIA's use of unmanned drones in warfare by claiming that the program was a state secret, even though it had been acknowledged and even defended multiple times by the Obama administration.

In February 2019, Virginia governor Ralph Northam was accused of using the Shaggy defense after photographs from his medical school yearbook page surfaced showing a man in blackface next to a man wearing Ku Klux Klan robes. When the story first came out, Northam stated that he apologized for being in the image. However, a day later, Northam changed his story, claiming that it was not him. Multiple commentators, including CNN political analyst April Ryan and Michael Eric Dyson, cited the song in their remarks on his conflicting explanations.

== See also ==
- Actual innocence
- Chewbacca defense
- Idiot defense
- King Kong defense
- Matrix defense
- Twinkie defense
