= Idiot defense =

Satirical term for legal strategy

"The idiot defense" is a satirical term for a legal strategy where a defendant claims innocence by virtue of having been ignorant of facts of which the defendant would normally be expected to be aware. This tactic has also been known as the dumb CEO defense, the dummy defense, the ostrich defense, the Ken Lay defense, and the Sergeant Schultz defense. The first known instance of the idiot defense was by John Henry Stafford, a lawyer in Jackson, Tennessee who was also known as Yankee John. He used it in the defense of Marlin Heady, a moonshiner. The charges were all allegedly dropped.

The term was popularized as a result of a number of high-profile corporate accounting scandal defendants claiming that all wrongdoing was performed by others, without the defendant's knowledge or consent. Attorneys for these defendants claimed that their skill was in valuation and deal-making, and that they lacked the training to recognize fraudulent accounting practices they claimed that they would have needed. However, in many cases the defendants' subordinates testified that the defendants ordered them to falsify the accounts.

== Examples ==
=== John J. Rigas ===
John J. Rigas, the founder of Adelphia, was charged with conspiracy, bank fraud, and securities fraud. Rigas's defense asserted that he expected the Adelphia board, lawyers, and external accountants to provide him warning of any possible abuse. In his closing statements, Rigas's lawyer asked "Does [John Rigas] have a right to believe that things would be done properly, that adequate and appropriate disclosures were made, that the lawyers and the accountants and the personal accountants would make sure of that?"

Rigas was convicted on July 8, 2004.

=== Walter A. Forbes ===
Walter Forbes, former CEO of CUC International, was charged with 16 counts in relation to inflated earnings statements from CUC before it merged with HFC Inc. to form Cendant. During his trial, Forbes testified to working on "the strategy vision part, talking to key clients ...." He also claimed he was "much more valuable to shareholders doing that than being in day-to-day operations." Forbes's attorney, Brendan Sullivan Jr., summarized: "The defense of Walter Forbes is that he didn't know about it."

The jury in the case against Forbes returned on January 4, 2005. While they did convict another defendant, they failed to reach a verdict on the charges against Forbes.

Forbes was found guilty of conspiracy to commit securities fraud and two counts of making false statements at a third trial on October 31, 2006.

=== Bernard J. Ebbers ===
In this case, Bernard J. "Bernie" Ebbers, former WorldCom CEO, claimed that $11 billion in fraud was committed by the company's CFO, Scott D. Sullivan, and other subordinates without Ebbers's knowledge. During his criminal trial, Ebbers testified, "I was shocked. I couldn't believe it, I never thought anything like that would have gone on. I put those people in place. I trusted them. I had no idea they would do anything like this."

The prosecutor referred to this as the "aw shucks defense." Ebbers was convicted of all charges on March 15, 2005.

=== Richard M. Scrushy ===
Richard M. Scrushy, founder and former CEO of HealthSouth, became the first CEO to be charged with violating the Sarbanes-Oxley Act. Scrushy's defense lawyer, Jim Parkman, asked during the trial, "That's what y'all did and how you planned it, so (Scrushy) wouldn't know what the whole picture was?"

Scrushy was found not guilty of all charges on June 28, 2005. But the idiot defense was not believed to have been the reason he was acquitted; instead, the prosecution apparently lacked enough courtroom-admissible evidence to make its case against him. He was later convicted by a Federal court on 30 additional charges.

=== Kenneth L. Lay ===
Kenneth L. Lay was indicted on charges of securities fraud, wire fraud, and making false and misleading statements in relation to the Enron collapse. In a 60 Minutes interview before his trial, Lay said, "I don't think I'm a fool. But I think I sure was fooled." He added, "But I can't take responsibility for the criminal conduct of someone inside the company."

Lay and Jeffrey Skilling were convicted on many of the charges.

== See also ==
- Shaggy defense
- Twinkie defense
- Ignorance is no excuse
