= Matrix defense =

Belief that crime took place in a simulation

The Matrix defense is a legal defense based on the premise of the film franchise The Matrix, in which reality is a computer generation and the real world is different from what reality is popularly perceived to be.

A defendant using this defense claims that they committed a crime because they believed that they were in a simulated world (the Matrix), and not in the real world. A defendant could allege they never intended death for their victim because they believed the victim to be alive in the other reality. This is a version of the insanity defense and considered a descendant of the Taxi Driver defense of John Hinckley, one of the first defenses based on blurring reality with films.

Regardless of whether the defendant believes that they were living within a simulated world, this defense has been used in cases where the accused were sent to mental-care facilities instead of prisons:

- Tonda Lynn Ansley of Hamilton, Ohio, was found not guilty by reason of insanity using this defense after shooting her landlady in the head in July 2002.
- Vadim Mieseges of San Francisco offered a Matrix explanation to police after chopping up his landlady, and was declared mentally incompetent to stand trial.
- Joshua Cooke's lawyers were going to attempt this defense in 2003 in his trial for the murder of his adoptive parents, before he pleaded guilty.
- The case of Lee Malvo, who participated in the sniper shootings of 30 victims in 2002, also included references to The Matrix, mentioned in the writings taken from his jail cell. Malvo reportedly shouted "free yourself from the Matrix" from his cell after his arrest, and told FBI agents to watch the film if they wanted to understand him.

== See also ==
- Affluenza defense
- Chewbacca defense
- King Kong defense
- Shaggy defense
- Simulated reality
- Twinkie defense
