= List of best-selling singles and albums of 2001 in Ireland =

This is a list of the top selling singles and top sellings albums in Ireland in 2001.

== Top selling singles ==
1. "Uptown Girl" – Westlife
2. "It Wasn't Me" – Shaggy
3. "Angel" – Shaggy featuring Rayvon
4. "Hey Baby" – DJ Ötzi
5. "Teenage Dirtbag" – Wheatus
6. "It's Raining Men" – Geri Halliwell
7. "Can't Get You Out of My Head" – Kylie Minogue
8. "Whole Again" – Atomic Kitten
9. "Don't Stop Movin'" – S Club 7
10. "Lady Marmalade" – Christina Aguilera, Lil' Kim, Mýa, Pink and Missy Elliott

== Top selling albums ==
1. Swing When You're Winning – Robbie Williams
2. No Angel – Dido
3. World of Our Own – Westlife
4. Survivor – Destiny's Child
5. All That You Can't Leave Behind – U2
6. White Ladder – David Gray
7. Just Enough Education to Perform – Stereophonics
8. Dreams Can Come True, Greatest Hits Vol. 1 – Gabrielle
9. This Is the Day – Christy Moore
10. Hybrid Theory – Linkin Park

Notes:

- *Compilation albums that are composed of Various Artists are not included.

== See also ==
- List of songs that reached number one on the Irish Singles Chart
- List of artists who reached number one in Ireland

== Resources ==
- IRMA Official Site
