= European Hot 100 Singles =

Billboard chart

The European Hot 100 Singles was compiled by Billboard and Music & Media magazine from March 1984 until December 2010. The chart was based on national singles sales charts in 17 European countries: Austria, Belgium (two charts separately for Flanders and Wallonia), Denmark, Finland, France, Germany, Greece, Hungary, Ireland, Italy, Netherlands, Norway, Portugal, Spain, Sweden, Switzerland, and the United Kingdom.

By the issue dated/week ending November 13, 2010, the European Hot 100 had accumulated 400 number one hits. The final chart was published on December 11, 2010, following the news of Billboard closing their London office and letting their UK-based staff go. The final number one single on the chart was "Only Girl (in the World)" by Rihanna.

== History ==
=== Europarade top 30 ===
The first attempt at a Europe-wide chart was the Europarade, which was started in early 1976 by the Dutch TROS radio network. The chart initially consisted of only six countries: the Netherlands, UK, France, Germany, Belgium and Spain. In 1979 Italy and Denmark were added and during 1980, Austria and Switzerland were included. Ireland was added as the eleventh country in October 1983. The compilers collected the top 15 records from each country and then awarded corresponding points, depending which positions between 1 and 15 each record stood at. The "Europarade" was published in Music Week from the early 1980s, and in the Dutch magazine Hitkrant. 1984 was the year in which the length of the chart was increased from a top 30 to a top 40.

=== Euro Hot 100 ===
In March 1984, Music & Media magazine in Amsterdam started their own singles chart, "European Top 100 Singles", which they published in the Eurotip Sheet for the first two years until issue April 19, 1986, after which its name was changed to Music & Media from issue April 26, 1986. The chart was based on national singles sales charts in sixteen European countries: Austria, Belgium (separately for Flanders and Wallonia), Denmark, Finland, France, West Germany, Greece, Ireland, Italy, Netherlands, Norway, Portugal, Spain, Sweden, Switzerland, and the United Kingdom. This chart was accumulated by taking the chart positions in each country combined with the national sales percentage of records in that particular country.

In 1986, the official Eurochart also became a music TV show on Music Box with Dutch presenter Erik de Zwart. It was known as the 'Coca-Cola Eurochart Hot 100 Singles' from May 1988 to the end of 1992. As a syndicated show, it was also introduced on UK commercial radio and was definitely being broadcast in summer-autumn 1989 and January to April 1991; however, its precise start and end dates are not known. By September, 1989, the 'Coca-Cola Eurochart Hot 100' chart was being broadcast on 65 European radio stations.

Hosted by Pat Sharp, it was broadcast on a number of stations including Radio Trent, BRMB, Viking FM and GWR FM. A TV version was broadcast on Super Channel during 1989 and 1990, and it was hosted by Dutch presenter Caroline Tensen. The Eurochart quickly gained momentum, as it started to include more countries.

Billboard became Music & Media's financial partner in 1985 and later owned the magazine. When Music & Media closed in August 2003, Billboard continued to compile the Eurochart Hot 100 Singles. The last European Hot 100 Singles chart to appear in Billboard magazine was in the issue dated December 11, 2010, but Billboard only ever published the top 20 of the chart. However, Billboard continued to publish a Euro Digital Songs chart which was a top 10 and which was discontinued after February 12, 2022.

== Chart achievements ==
=== Artists achievements ===
==== Most number-one singles ====
- Madonna (17)
- ABBA (13)
- Michael Jackson (10)
- Eminem (8)
- Britney Spears (6)
- Boney M. (6)
- Elton John (5)
- Rihanna (5)
- Whitney Houston (5)
- Beyoncé (4)
- Kylie Minogue (4)
- Robbie Williams (4)
- Shakira (4)

==== Self-replacement at number-one ====
- Michael Jackson

"Bad" replaced "I Just Can't Stop Loving You" (October 1987)

- Spice Girls

"Say You'll Be There" replaced "Wannabe" (November 1996)

- The Black Eyed Peas

"Meet Me Halfway" replaced "I Gotta Feeling" (December 2009)

- Rihanna

"Only Girl (In the World)" replaced "Love the Way You Lie" (November 2010)

==== Simultaneously occupying the top of the singles and albums charts ====
Madonna is the artist which has scored the most simultaneous number-ones with seven singles and six albums, followed by Michael Jackson with five singles and three albums and Lady Gaga with three singles and one album.

More than 2 number-ones

- Madonna

"Papa Don't Preach" and True Blue (August 1986)
"True Blue" and True Blue (October 1986)
"Like a Prayer" and Like a Prayer (April 1989)
"Don't Cry for Me Argentina" and Evita OST (February 1997)
"Music" and Music (October 2000)
"Hung Up" and Confessions on a Dance Floor (November 2005)
"4 Minutes" and Hard Candy (May 2008)

- Michael Jackson

"Bad" and Bad (October 1987)
"Dirty Diana" and Bad (July 1988)
"Black or White" and Dangerous (December 1991)
"Scream" and HIStory: Past, Present and Future, Book I (June 1995)
"You Are Not Alone" and HIStory: Past, Present and Future, Book I (September 1995)

- Lady Gaga

"Poker Face" and The Fame (May 2009)
"Bad Romance" and The Fame (January 2010)
"Telephone" and The Fame (April 2010)

2 number-one singles and albums

- Whitney Houston

"I Wanna Dance With Somebody (Who Loves Me)" and Whitney (August 1987)
"I Will Always Love You" and The Bodyguard OST (January 1993)

- Bryan Adams

"(Everything I Do) I Do It for You" and Waking Up the Neighbours (November 1991)
"All for Love" and So Far So Good (January 1994)

- Bon Jovi

"Always" and Cross Road (November 1994)
"It's My Life" and Crush (June 2000)

- Britney Spears

"Oops!... I Did It Again" and Oops!... I Did It Again (June 2000)
"Womanizer" and Circus (December 2008)

- Robbie Williams

"Somethin' Stupid" and Swing When You're Winning (January 2002)
"Do They Know It's Christmas?" and Greatest Hits (November 2004)

- Nelly Furtado

"All Good Things (Come to an End)" and Loose (January 2007)
"Give It to Me" and Loose (April 2007)

1 number-one single and album

- U2

"With or Without You" and The Joshua Tree (May 1987)

- George Michael

"Faith" and Faith (December 1987)

- Phil Collins

"Another Day in Paradise" and ...But Seriously (January 1990)

- 2 Unlimited

"No Limit" and No Limits (May 1993)

- 4 Non Blondes

"What's Up?" and Bigger, Better, Faster, More! (October 1993)

- Meat Loaf

"I'd Do Anything for Love (But I Won't Do That)" and Bat Out of Hell II: Back into Hell (November 1993)

- Wet Wet Wet

"Love is All Around" and End of Part One: Their Greatest Hits (September 1994)

- Take That

"Back for Good" and Nobody Else (May 1995)

- The Fugees

"Killing Me Softly" and The Score (July 1996)

- Elton John

"Candle in the Wind 1997" and The Big Picture (October 1997)

- Cher

"Believe" and Believe (February 1999)

- Backstreet Boys

"I Want It That Way" and Millennium (June 1999)

- Santana

"Maria Maria" and Supernatural (May 2000)

- Dido

"Stan" and No Angel (February 2001)

- Shaggy

"Angel" and Hot Shot (August 2001)

- Kylie Minogue

"Can't Get You Out of My Head" and Fever (October 2001)

- Shakira

"Whenever, Wherever" and Laundry Service (March 2002)

- Eminem

"Without Me" and The Eminem Show (June 2002)

- Beyoncé

"Crazy in Love" and Dangerously in Love (July 2003)

- Evanescence

"Bring Me to Life" and Fallen (August 2003)

- Jennifer Lopez

"Get Right" and Rebirth (March 2005)

- Justin Timberlake

"SexyBack" and FutureSex/LoveSounds (September 2006)

- Scissor Sisters

"I Don't Feel Like Dancin'" and Ta-Dah (October 2006)

- James Blunt

"1973" and All the Lost Souls (October 2007)

- Duffy

"Mercy" and Rockferry (April 2008)

- David Guetta

"Sexy Bitch" and One Love (September 2009)

- Rihanna

"Only Girl (In the World)" and Loud (December 2010)

=== Songs achievements ===
==== Entered at number-one ====
- "No Limit" by 2 Unlimited (February 11, 1993)
- "Tribal Dance" by 2 Unlimited (May 12, 1993)
- "The Real Thing" by 2 Unlimited (May 18, 1994)
- "Music" by Madonna (September 8, 2000)
- "Beautiful Day" by U2 (October 28, 2000)
- "One More Time" by Daft Punk (December 2, 2000)
- "Stan" by Eminem (featuring Dido) (December 23, 2000)
- "Angel" by Shaggy (featuring Rayvon) (July 16, 2001)
- "Can't Get You Out of My Head" by Kylie Minogue (October 6, 2001)
- "Without Me" by Eminem (June 8, 2002)
- "Me Against the Music" by Britney Spears (featuring Madonna) (November 29, 2003)
- "Toxic" by Britney Spears (March 20, 2004)
- "Yeah!" by Usher (featuring Lil Jon & Ludacris) (April 3, 2004)
- "Radio" by Robbie Williams (October 23, 2004)
- "Just Lose It" by Eminem (November 20, 2004)
- "Get Right" by Jennifer Lopez (March 5, 2005)
- "Let Me Love You" by Mario (April 9, 2005)
- "Tripping" by Robbie Williams (October 22, 2005)
- "Run It!" by Chris Brown (February 18, 2006)
- "Sorry" by Madonna (March 11, 2006)
- "Bodies" by Robbie Williams (October 31, 2009)

==== Most weeks at number-one ====
- 18 weeks

"(Everything I Do) I Do It for You" by Bryan Adams (1991)

- 17 weeks

"My Heart Will Go On" by Céline Dion (1998)

- 16 weeks

"Can't Get You Out of My Head" by Kylie Minogue (2001)
"Poker Face" by Lady Gaga (2009), non-consecutive
"The Ketchup Song (Asereje)" by Las Ketchup (2002-2003), non-consecutive

- 15 weeks

"Lambada" by Kaoma (1989)
"Rhythm Is a Dancer" by Snap! (1992), non-consecutive
"Without Me" by Eminem (2002)
"Hips Don't Lie" by Shakira (featuring Wyclef Jean) (2006), non-consecutive
"Apologize" by Timbaland (featuring OneRepublic) (2007), non-consecutive

- 14 weeks

"I Just Called to Say I Love You" by Stevie Wonder (1984)
"Gangsta's Paradise" by Coolio (featuring L.V.) (1995), non-consecutive
"Believe" by Cher (1999)

- 13 weeks

"Rivers of Babylon"/"Brown Girl in the Ring" by Boney M. (1978)
"I Will Always Love You" by Whitney Houston (1993)
"No Limit" by 2 Unlimited (1993)
"Love Is All Around" by Wet Wet Wet (1994)
"Children" by Robert Miles (1996)
"Whenever, Wherever" by Shakira (2002)
"Shut Up" by The Black Eyed Peas (2003)

==== Non-English language number-ones ====
- "99 Luftballons" by Nena (German – April 2, 1983 for 5 weeks)
- "Rock Me Amadeus" by Falco (German – July 27, 1985 for 2 weeks)
- "Yé ké yé ké" by Mory Kanté (Mandinka – June 18, 1988 for 3 weeks)
- "Im Nin'Alu" by Ofra Haza (Hebrew – August 6, 1988 for 2 weeks)
- "Lambada" by Kaoma (Portuguese – September 23, 1989 for 15 weeks)
- "Sadeness Part I" by Enigma (French/Latin – January 12, 1991 for 9 weeks)
- "La Copa de la Vida" by Ricky Martin (Spanish – June 20, 1998 for 5 weeks)
- "Dragostea din tei" by O-Zone (Romanian – June 26, 2004 for 12 weeks)
- "Obsesión" by Aventura (Spanish – September 18, 2004 for 6 weeks)
- "Alors on danse" by Stromae (French – March 20, 2010 for 10 weeks)

These songs are partly in English, but also partly another language.

- "Macarena" by Los Del Rio (Spanish/English – June 22, 1996 for 4 weeks)
- "Time to Say Goodbye" by Andrea Bocelli & Sarah Brightman (Italian/English – June 7, 1997 for 1 week)
- "The Ketchup Song (Asereje)" by Las Ketchup (Spanish/English – September 21, 2002 for 16 weeks)
- "I Know You Want Me (Calle Ocho)" by Pitbull (Spanish/English – August 1, 2009 for 6 weeks)
- "Waka Waka (This Time for Africa)" by Shakira (featuring Freshlyground) (Fang/Xhosa/English – August 7, 2010 for 6 weeks)
- "We No Speak Americano" by Yolanda Be Cool & DCUP (Neapolitan/English – September 18, 2010 for 3 weeks)
