= Chewbacca defense =

Nonsensical diversionary legal defense

Johnnie Cochran uses the Chewbacca defense against Chef in the South Park episode "Chef Aid".

In a jury trial, the Chewbacca defense is a legal strategy in which a criminal defense lawyer tries to confuse the jury rather than refute the case of the prosecutor. It is an intentional distraction or obfuscation. As a Chewbacca defense distracts and misleads, it is an example of a red herring. It is also an example of an irrelevant conclusion, a type of informal fallacy in which one making an argument fails to address the issue in question. Often an opposing counsel can legally object to such arguments by declaring them irrelevant, character evidence, or argumentative.

The name "Chewbacca defense" comes from "Chef Aid", an episode of the American animated series South Park. The episode, which premiered on October 7, 1998, satirizes the O. J. Simpson murder trial, particularly attorney Johnnie Cochran's closing argument for the defense. In the episode, a fictionalized version of Cochran bases his argument on a false premise about the 1983 film Return of the Jedi. He asks the jury why a Wookiee like Chewbacca would want to live on Endor with the much smaller Ewoks when "it does not make sense". He argues that if Chewbacca living on Endor does not make sense—and if even mentioning Chewbacca in the case does not make sense—then the jury must acquit.

== Origin ==
In the episode, the character of Chef contacts a "major record company" executive, seeking to have his name credited as the composer of a fictional Alanis Morissette hit called "Stinky Britches". Chef's claim is substantiated by a 20‑year-old recording of Chef performing the song. The record company refuses and hires Johnnie Cochran, who files a lawsuit against Chef for harassment. In court, Cochran resorts to his "famous" Chewbacca defense, which he "used during the Simpson trial", according to Chef's lawyer, Gerald Broflovski. Although Broflovski uses logic, reasoning, and the fact that Chef properly copyrighted his work, Cochran counters with the following:

Cochran
I have one final thing I want you to consider. Ladies and gentlemen, this is Chewbacca. Chewbacca is a Wookiee from the planet Kashyyyk. But Chewbacca lives on the planet Endor. Now think about it; that does not make sense!
Gerald Broflovski
Dammit! ... He's using the Chewbacca defense!
Cochran
Why would a Wookiee, an 8-foot-tall Wookiee, want to live on Endor, with a bunch of 2-foot-tall Ewoks? That does not make sense! But more important, you have to ask yourself: What does this have to do with this case? Nothing. Ladies and gentlemen, it has nothing to do with this case! It does not make sense! Look at me. I'm a lawyer defending a major record company, and I'm talkin' about Chewbacca! Does that make sense? Ladies and gentlemen, I am not making any sense! None of this makes sense! And so you have to remember, when you're in that jury room deliberatin' and conjugatin' the Emancipation Proclamation, does it make sense? No! Ladies and gentlemen of this supposed jury, it does not make sense! If Chewbacca lives on Endor, you must acquit! The defense rests.

This statement is a parody of Cochran's closing arguments in the O. J. Simpson murder case, where he said to the jury, "If it doesn't fit, you must acquit", in reference to a courtroom demonstration in which Simpson appeared unable to fit a pair of bloody leather gloves found at the murder scene over the medical gloves he was wearing.

In a June 28, 1995 memo to Cochran, Gerald Uelmen came up with (and Cochran later repeated) a quip he used in his closing arguments, "If it doesn't fit, you must acquit." In his memo to Cochran, Uelmen noted that the phrase not only applied to the gloves, but to the evidence presented by the prosecutors:

What the memo really tries to do is play off the jury instructions... I thought that instruction on circumstantial evidence [CALJIC 2.01] was just incredibly good for us, so when we knew that instruction was going to be given, it just popped out at me. It says if it doesn't fit, you must acquit. What I was trying to do is not just remind the jury of that moment in the trial of trying on the glove, but the whole concept of did the evidence really fit the story that the prosecution was trying to present.

In the episode, Cochran's defense is successful. The jury finds Chef guilty of "harassing a major record label", after which the judge sets his punishment as either a $2 million fine to be paid within 24 hours or, failing that, four years in prison (the judge initially sentences him to eight million years before being corrected by a court officer). Ultimately, a "Chef Aid" benefit concert is organized to raise money for Chef to hire Cochran for his own lawsuit against the record company. At the concert, Cochran has a change of heart and offers to represent Chef pro bono. He again successfully uses the Chewbacca defense, this time to defeat the record company and force them to acknowledge Chef's authorship of their song. In the second use of the Chewbacca defense, he ends by taking out a monkey puppet and shouting, "Here, look at the monkey. Look at the silly monkey!" causing a juror's head to explode.

== Use ==
The Associated Press obituary for Cochran mentioned the Chewbacca defense parody as one of the ways in which the attorney had entered pop culture. Criminologist Thomas O'Connor says that when DNA evidence shows "inclusion", that is, does not exonerate a client by exclusion from the DNA sample provided, "About the only thing you can do is attack the lab for its (lack of) quality assurance and proficiency testing, or use a 'Chewbacca defense' … and try to razzle-dazzle the jury about how complex and complicated the other side's evidence or probability estimates are." Forensic scientist Erin Kenneally has argued that court challenges to digital evidence frequently use the Chewbacca defense by presenting multiple alternative explanations of forensic evidence obtained from computers and Internet providers to confuse the jury into reasonable doubt. Kenneally also provides methods that can be used to rebut a Chewbacca defense. Kenneally and colleague Anjali Swienton have presented this topic before the Florida State Court System and at the 2005 American Academy of Forensic Sciences annual meeting.

The term has seen use in political commentary. Ellis Weiner wrote in The Huffington Post in January 2007 that right-wing commentator Dinesh D'Souza was using the Chewbacca defense in criticism of then new Speaker of the House Nancy Pelosi, defining it as when "someone asserts his claim by saying something so patently nonsensical that the listener's brain shuts down completely". Jay Heinrichs' book Thank You for Arguing states that the term Chewbacca defense was "sneaking into the lexicon" as another name for the red herring fallacy. The term was used by Paul Krugman, who wrote in The New York Times that John Taylor uses the Chewbacca defense as a seemingly last option for defending his hawkish monetary policy position, after years of publicly stating that "quantitative easing would lead to a major acceleration of inflation."

== Analysis by lawyers ==
Lawyer Josh Gilliland states in his blog, "A judge likely would say, 'I have a bad feeling about this' and possibly declare a mistrial if such an argument was made in court." Gilliland continued, "A party successfully using the Chewbacca Defense to confuse the jury into engaging in jury nullification in a civil lawsuit runs the risk of the losing party winning on a judgment notwithstanding the verdict (JNOV). In Chef's case, the copyright violation should have entitled him to a judgment as a matter of law." Lawyer Devin Stone outlined all the things that he stated would never happen in a real case, giving the episode a "C-" for legal accuracy.

== See also ==
- Affluenza defense – Socio-psychological effects of consumerism
- Dead cat strategy – Introduction of a distracting topic
- King Kong defense – Copyright infringement trial of torrent tracker
- Matrix defense – Belief that crime took place in a simulation
- Shaggy defense – Denial with the defense "it wasn't me"
- Twinkie defense – Mocking term for improbable legal defense
- Gish gallop – Rapid-fire argument rhetorical technique
