= Angel (Shaggy song) =

2001 song by Shaggy

Single by Shaggy featuring Rayvon

from the album Hot Shot
- B-side: "Chica Bonita"
- Released: 9 January 2001
- Studio: Big Yard (Jamaica); Ranch (Valley Stream, New York); HC&F (Freeport, New York)
- Length: 3:55 (album version); 3:31 (radio edit)
- Label: MCA
- Songwriters: Steve Miller; Ahmet Ertegun; Eddie Curtis; Chip Taylor
- Producer: Shaun "Sting" Pizzonia

Shaggy singles chronology
| "It Wasn't Me" (2000) | "Angel" (2001) | "Luv Me, Luv Me" (2001) |

Rayvon singles chronology
| "In the Summertime" (1995) | "Angel" (2000) | "2-Way" (2002) |

Music video
- "Angel" on YouTube

"Angel" is a song by Jamaican reggae artist Shaggy featuring Barbadian singer Rayvon. It is the second single from Shaggy's fifth studio album, Hot Shot (2000). The song interpolates the 1967 song "Angel of the Morning" and also samples the bassline of the 1973 song "The Joker" by American rock band Steve Miller Band. It was released to radio on 9 January 2001 as the follow-up to Shaggy's international number-one hit, "It Wasn't Me". "Angel" also proved to be successful, reaching number one in 12 countries, including Australia, Germany, Ireland, the United Kingdom, and the United States.

== Composition ==
The song interpolates the melody of the 1967 song "Angel of the Morning", written and composed by American songwriter Chip Taylor, that has been recorded numerous times and has been a hit single for various artists, including American singers Merrilee Rush and Juice Newton and also samples from the 1973 song "The Joker" by American rock band Steve Miller Band.

== Commercial reception ==
The song debuted at number 81 on the US Billboard Hot 100 on the week ending 30 December 2000. The song first entered the top 40 at number 39 on the week ending 20 January 2001. It peaked at number one on the chart week of 31 March 2001, for one week. According to Billboard writer Silvio Pietroluongo, "Angel" beat Crazy Town's "Butterfly" to number one by a margin of two points, which was the smallest gap between two singles since the magazine began having its charts stored digitally in 1985. It was also the second song to reach number one without a retail release, after Aaliyah's "Try Again" (2000), although physical formats would later be issued in the United States on 24 April 2001. "Angel" was the 17th-most-successful song of 2001 in the US and has sold 1,494,000 digital copies in the US as of April 2016.

Internationally, the song reached number one in Australia, Austria, Flanders, Germany, Ireland, the Netherlands, Norway, Portugal, Sweden, Switzerland, and the United Kingdom, topping the Eurochart Hot 100 as well. In Australia, it peaked atop the ARIA Singles Chart for eight weeks, finishing fourth on the Australian year-end chart for 2001. It was also an enduring hit in Ireland, where it is the 20th-highest-selling single of all time.

== Music video ==
The music video was directed by Cameron Casey.

The beginning of the music video features two animated women dancing in the sky wearing red and the other wearing white with it cutting to him between two walls that resemble hell and heaven. It features a luxurious tone and style throughout the rest of the music video including Shaggy and Rayvon singing together in multiple different scenes while both are wearing white.

== Track listings ==
US maxi-CD and Japanese CD single

1. "Angel" (album version)
2. "Angel" (remix)
3. "Angel" (instrumental)
4. "Angel" (live)

US 7-inch single

A. "Angel" – 3:55
B. "Chica Bonita" – 4:02

US 12-inch single

A1. "Angel" (album version) – 3:55
B1. "Angel" (Dance Hall remix) – 3:51
B2. "Angel" (Dance Hall remix instrumental) – 3:51

Australian and European maxi-CD single

1. "Angel" (radio edit) — 3:31
2. "Angel" (Seabreeze mix) — 3:46
3. "It Wasn't Me" (Crash & Burn remix featuring Rikrok) — 5:37
4. "Angel" (enhanced video)

European CD single

1. "Angel" (radio edit) — 3:31
2. "Angel" (Seabreeze mix) — 3:46

UK CD single

1. "Angel" (radio edit)
2. "Angel" (Crash & Burn remix)
3. "Angel" (Seabreeze mix)
4. "Angel" (video)

UK 12-inch single

A1. "Angel" (Crash & Burn remix)
AA1. "Angel" (Seabreeze mix)
AA2. "Angel" (radio edit)

UK cassette single

1. "Angel" (radio edit)
2. "Angel" (Crash & Burn remix)
3. "Angel" (Seabreeze mix)

== Credits and personnel ==
Credits are taken from the Hot Shot album booklet.

Studios

- Recorded at Big Yard Studios (Jamaica), Ranch Recording Studios (Valley Stream, New York), and HC&F Studio (Freeport, New York)
- Mixed at Ranch Recording Studios (Valley Stream, New York)
- Mastered at Sterling Sound (New York City)

Personnel

- Steve Miller – writing
- Ahmet Ertegun – writing
- Eddie Curtis – writing
- Chip Taylor – writing
- Gordon Dukes – background vocals
- Robert Zapata – guitar
- Phillip George Henry – guitar
- Carlos Sanchez – keyboard
- Shaun "Sting" Pizzonia – drums, production, recording, mixing
- Chris Gehringer – mastering

== Charts ==
=== Weekly charts ===
| Chart (2001) | Peak position |
|---|---|
| Australia (ARIA) | 1 |
| Australian Urban (ARIA) | 1 |
| Austria (Ö3 Austria Top 40) | 1 |
| Belgium (Ultratop 50 Flanders) | 1 |
| Belgium (Ultratop 50 Wallonia) | 2 |
| Canada CHR (Nielsen BDS) | 1 |
| Denmark (Tracklisten) | 2 |
| Europe (Eurochart Hot 100) | 1 |
| Finland (Suomen virallinen lista) | 10 |
| France (SNEP) | 8 |
| Germany (GfK) | 1 |
| Hungary (Mahasz) | 2 |
| Ireland (IRMA) | 1 |
| Italy (FIMI) | 50 |
| Netherlands (Dutch Top 40) | 1 |
| Netherlands (Single Top 100) | 1 |
| New Zealand (Recorded Music NZ) | 4 |
| Norway (VG-lista) | 1 |
| Poland Airplay (Music & Media) | 2 |
| Portugal (AFP) | 1 |
| Romania (Romanian Top 100) | 25 |
| Scottish Singles Sales (Official Charts) | 1 |
| Sweden (Sverigetopplistan) | 1 |
| Switzerland (Schweizer Hitparade) | 1 |
| UK Singles (Official Charts) | 1 |
| UK Hip Hop/R&B (Official Charts) | 1 |
| US Billboard Hot 100 | 1 |
| US Adult Pop Airplay (Billboard) | 33 |
| US Hot R&B/Hip-Hop Songs (Billboard) | 46 |
| US Hot Rap Songs (Billboard) | 5 |
| US Pop Airplay (Billboard) | 1 |
| US Rhythmic Airplay (Billboard) | 1 |

| Chart (2025) | Peak position |
|---|---|
| Romania Airplay (TopHit) | 95 |

=== Year-end charts ===
| Chart (2001) | Position |
|---|---|
| Australia (ARIA) | 4 |
| Australian Urban (ARIA) | 2 |
| Austria (Ö3 Austria Top 40) | 5 |
| Belgium (Ultratop 50 Flanders) | 5 |
| Belgium (Ultratop 50 Wallonia) | 27 |
| Canada Radio (Nielsen BDS) | 15 |
| Europe (Eurochart Hot 100) | 9 |
| France (SNEP) | 44 |
| Germany (Media Control) | 9 |
| Ireland (IRMA) | 3 |
| Netherlands (Dutch Top 40) | 9 |
| Netherlands (Single Top 100) | 4 |
| New Zealand (RIANZ) | 34 |
| Romania (Romanian Top 100) | 80 |
| Sweden (Hitlistan) | 5 |
| Switzerland (Schweizer Hitparade) | 4 |
| UK Singles (OCC) | 8 |
| US Billboard Hot 100 | 17 |
| US Mainstream Top 40 (Billboard) | 3 |
| US Rhythmic Top 40 (Billboard) | 7 |

=== Decade-end charts ===
| Chart (2000–2009) | Position |
|---|---|
| Australia (ARIA) | 64 |
| Austria (Ö3 Austria Top 40) | 34 |
| Netherlands (Single Top 100) | 23 |

=== All-time charts ===
| Chart | Position |
|---|---|
| Ireland (IRMA) | 20 |

== Certifications and sales ==
| Region | Certification | Certified units/sales |
|---|---|---|
| Australia (ARIA) | 3× Platinum | 210,000^{^} |
| Austria (IFPI Austria) | Platinum | 40,000^{*} |
| Belgium (BRMA) | Platinum | 50,000^{*} |
| Denmark (IFPI Danmark) | Platinum | 8,000^{^} |
| Denmark (IFPI Danmark) reissue | Gold | 45,000^{‡} |
| France (SNEP) | Gold | 250,000^{*} |
| Germany (BVMI) | Platinum | 600,000^{‡} |
| Netherlands (NVPI) | Platinum | 60,000^{^} |
| New Zealand (RMNZ) | 4× Platinum | 120,000^{‡} |
| Norway (IFPI Norway) | Platinum | |
| Sweden (GLF) | 2× Platinum | 60,000^{^} |
| Switzerland (IFPI Switzerland) | Platinum | 40,000^{^} |
| United Kingdom (BPI) 2001 release | Gold | 620,000 |
| United Kingdom (BPI) 2004 release | Platinum | 600,000^{‡} |
| United States | — | 1,494,000 |
^{*} Sales figures based on certification alone.^{^} Shipments figures based on certification alone.^{‡} Sales+streaming figures based on certification alone.

== Release history ==
| Region | Date | Format(s) | Label(s) | Ref. |
|---|---|---|---|---|
| United States | 9 January 2001 | Rhythmic contemporary radio | MCA | |
| United States | 30 January 2001 | Contemporary hit radio | MCA | |
| United States | 24 April 2001 | Maxi-CD | MCA | |
| Japan | 28 April 2001 | CD | Universal Music Japan | |
| Australia | 28 May 2001 | CD | MCA | |
| United Kingdom | 28 May 2001 | 12-inch vinyl; CD; cassette | MCA | |

== Later versions ==
- German singer Max Raabe and Palast Orchester covered the song in a big band style, for his 2001 album, Super Hits 2.
- In 2001, the parody song "You Ripped Off Angel (of the Morning)" was released by Adam Posegate and received airplay on the Dr. Demento Show.
- R&B artist Bei Maejor did a version of this song sampling the chorus and the beat. It appeared on his mixtape Upsideown2.
- For the 20th anniversary re-recording of Hot Shot, Rayvon's part is performed by Sting instead.

== See also ==
- List of Billboard Hot 100 number-one singles of 2001
- List of best-selling singles and albums of 2001 in Ireland
- List of UK Singles Chart number ones of the 2000s
