= What's Love =

Single by Shaggy featuring Akon

from the album Intoxication
- B-side: "Feel the Rush" (Extended Mix)
- Released: November 14, 2008
- Recorded: 2007
- Length: 3:06
- Label: VP Records
- Songwriters: O. Burrell, A. Thiam
- Producer: A. Thiam

Shaggy singles chronology
"Bonafide Girl" (2008)	"What's Love" (2008)	"Feel The Rush" (2008)

Akon singles chronology
"Holla Holla" (2008)	"What's Love" (2008)	"Beautiful" (2008)

"What's Love" is the third and final single from rapper Shaggy's seventh studio album, Intoxication. The song features guest vocals from Akon. The song was released on November 14, 2008. A French version of the song was recorded, featuring vocals from Lord Kossity. It was released in France in September 2008. The video for the song was directed by Hype Williams.

== Reception ==
AllMusic stated that in his crossover songs, like this one, "Shaggy is more discerning than ever and makes sure the radio-friendly material is right in line with his skill set."

== Track listing ==
CD Single

1. "What's Love" (Original Album Edit) – 3:08
2. "What's Love" (New Radio Edit) - 3:08
3. "What's Love" (Extended Version) – 4:03
1. "What's Love" (Big Room Mix) – 6:33
2. "Feel The Rush" (Extended Mix) - 5:00
3. "What's Love" (Video - New Radio Edit Version) - 3:08

French CD Single

1. "What's Love" (Remix Feat. Lord Kossity) – 2:54
2. "What's Love" (Extended Remix Feat. Lord Kossity) – 3:52

== Charts ==
=== Weekly charts ===
Chart (2008)	Peak position
Germany (GfK)	52

=== Year-end charts ===
Chart (2009)	Position
Hungarian Singles Chart	170
