= Billboard Canadian Albums =

Canadian chart for music album sales

The Billboard Canadian Albums is the official record chart ranking the 100 most popular music albums and extended plays in Canada. It is compiled weekly (every Monday) by U.S.-based music sales tracking company Luminate, and published every Tuesday by American music and entertainment magazine Billboard. The albums are compared across all genres, ranked by album sales, audio on-demand streaming activity and digital sales of tracks from albums.

== History ==
Prior to October 27, 2015, the Canadian albums charts were determined only by pure album sales compiled by Nielsen SoundScan, and published by Jam! Canoe, issued every Sunday. The move to the newly named Canadian Albums chart, now published by Billboard, also included a new formula. This new chart for the first time included on-demand streaming activity and digital track sales, along with the pure album sales which were solely counted previously. It also included Track Equivalent Albums (TEA), which equate ten digital track sales from one album to one equivalent album sale, as well as Stream Equivalent Albums (SEA), which equate 1,500 song streams from an album to one equivalent album sale.

== Chart achievements ==
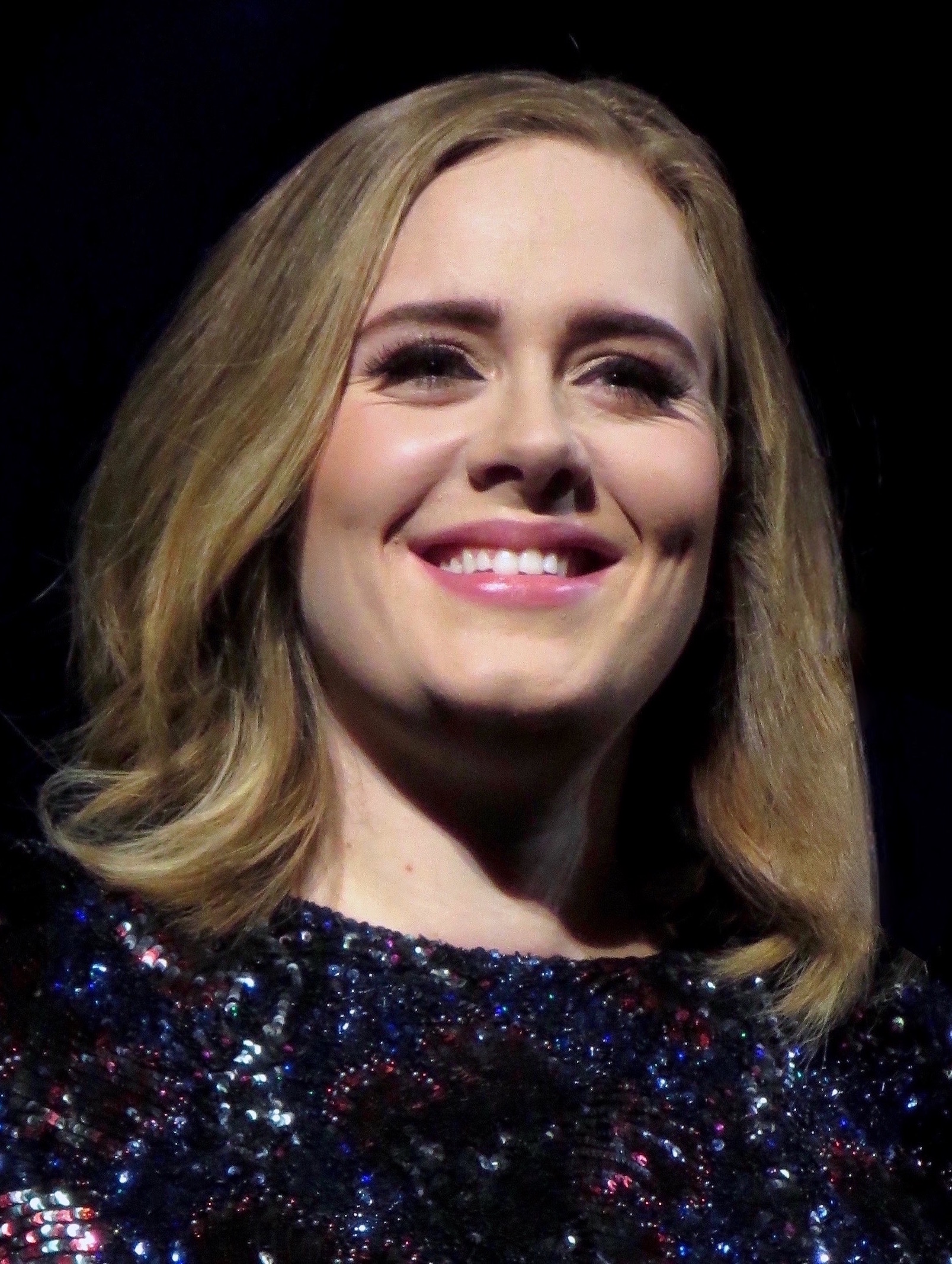
21 by Adele spent the most weeks at number one on the Billboard Canadian Albums.

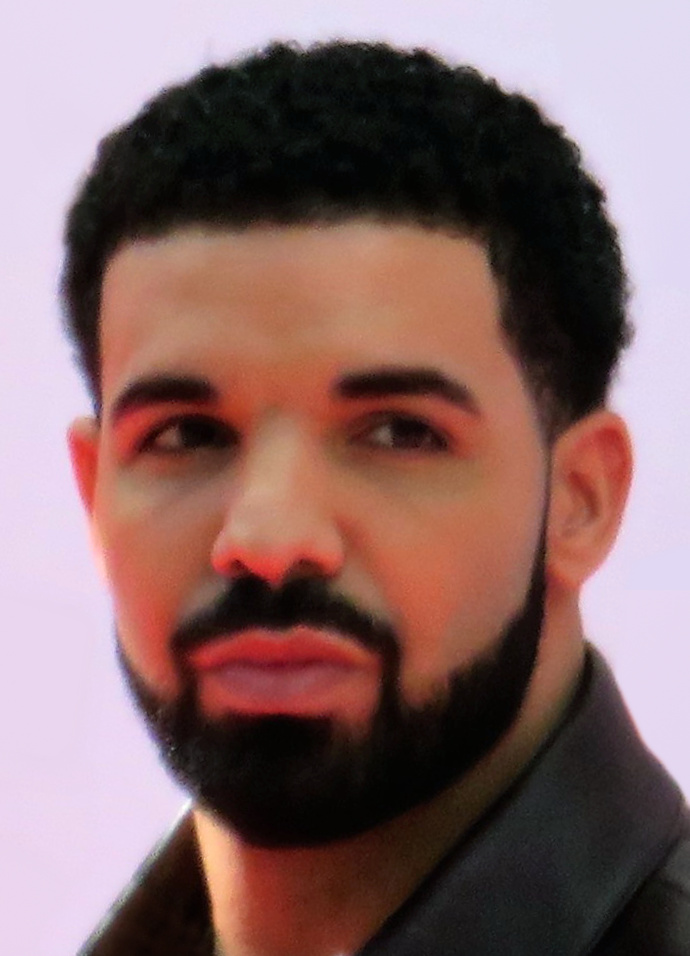
Drake charted 17 number ones on the Billboard Canadian Albums, the most for any artist.

=== Albums with most weeks at number-one ===
35 weeks

- Adele – 21 (2011–12)

25 weeks

- Morgan Wallen – One Thing at a Time (2023–24)

19 weeks

- Michael Bublé – Christmas (2011–2026)

15 weeks

- SZA – SOS (2022–25)

13 weeks

- Eminem – The Marshall Mathers LP (2000)
- Taylor Swift – The Life of a Showgirl (2025–26)

12 weeks

- Adele – 25 (2015–16)
- Drake – Views (2016)
- Taylor Swift – The Tortured Poets Department (2024)
- Morgan Wallen – I'm the Problem (2025)

11 weeks

- James Horner – Titanic: Music from the Motion Picture (1997)
- Shania Twain – Up! (2002–03)

10 weeks

- Shaggy – Hot Shot (2001)
- Avril Lavigne – Under My Skin (2004)
- Lady Gaga and Bradley Cooper – A Star Is Born (2018–19)
- Olivia Rodrigo – Sour (2021–22)

=== Artists with the most weeks at number-one ===
1. Taylor Swift – 61
2. Eminem – 55
3. Adele – 53
4. Drake – 52
5. Morgan Wallen – 45

=== Artists with the most number-one albums ===
1. Drake – 17
2. Celine Dion – 15 (tie)
2. Taylor Swift – 15 (tie)
3. Eminem – 11
4. Kanye West – 10 (tie)
4. Justin Bieber – 10 (tie)
5. Madonna – 9

== See also ==
- RPM (magazine)
- The Record (magazine)
