= Church Heathen =

Single by Shaggy

from the album Intoxication
- Released: August 27, 2007
- Recorded: 2007
- Genre: Reggae
- Length: 4:11
- Label: VP Records
- Songwriters: Christopher Birch, Shaggy, Rickadoo George Ducent, Andre O'Neil Fennell, Maurice George Gregory, Anthony Kelly
- Producers: DJ Sting International, Tony Kelly

Shaggy singles chronology
"Ultimatum" (2006)	"Church Heathen" (2007)	"Bonafide Girl" (2008)

"Church Heathen" is the first single from Jamaican rapper Shaggy's seventh studio album, Intoxication. The track features guest vocals from Ninjaman. The song was produced by Shaun Pizzonia and Tony Kelly, and was released on August 27, 2007.

== Background ==
The track serves a testimonial of some of the scandals and "heathens" he found in church. In the intro of the song, he states, "If you tek dis too serious, then you really need sum church", which is Patois for, "If you take this too seriously, then you really need some church." In the song he mentions characters such as Sis. Pam, who tells him everything about the congregation, Sis. Gwen, who claims that she is a Christian but dances to inappropriate songs in the opinion of Christians such as the Dutty Wine, Sis. Paulette, who is sleeping with the driver of a mini bus, a means of public transportation in the Caribbean, and also has a gay husband. He also states that the next Sunday he will 'find himself' in church because in his opinion, soap operas cannot be as 'sweet' as the information he is receiving in the church.

== Track listing ==
CD Single

1. "Church Heathen"
2. "Church Heathen" (Instrumental)

== Music video ==
There are two videos for the song. One, which was shot in Jamaica and was released to Tempo Television, and the other, released to other stationing during the summer of 2007. The second video can be considered as an upgrade from the first in that the quality and vibe is more sophisticated than the first. The first video was shot entirely around and in a church and has much more relation to the powerful message found in the lyrics of the song, while the second video was shot at The Quad Night Club in Kingston, Jamaica. Many people from the first video return to the second video. In addition to the second video, it features a verse by Ninja Man. The song is also featured in the soundtrack of the 2008 video game Grand Theft Auto IV.
