= Hot Shot (Shaggy album) =

Studio album by Shaggy
- Released: 8 August 2000
- Genre: Reggae fusion; dancehall
- Length: 54:09
- Label: MCA; Geffen
- Producer: Robert Livingston; Shaun "Sting" Pizzonia; Jimmy Jam & Terry Lewis; Christopher Birch; Gordon Dukes; Shaggy; Dave Kelly; Tony "CD" Kelly

Shaggy chronology
Midnite Lover (1997)	Hot Shot (2000)	Lucky Day (2002)

Singles from Hot Shot
- 1. "It Wasn't Me" Released: 7 November 2000; 2. "Angel" Released: 9 January 2001; 3. "Luv Me, Luv Me" Released: 31 May 2001; 4. "Dance & Shout / Hope" Released: 19 November 2001

Professional ratings
Review scores
Source	Rating
AllMusic	4/5 stars
Entertainment Weekly	C+
NME	1.5/5 stars
People	favorable
Plugged In (publication)	unfavorable
Q	3/5 stars
Robert Christgau	(neither)
The Source	average
USA Today	3/4 stars

Hot Shot is the fifth studio album released by Jamaican-American singer Shaggy. The album was first released on 8 August 2000, in the United States, before being issued in the United Kingdom on 9 October 2000, with a revised track listing. The revised UK edition was also released in Europe, but without the song "Why You Mad at Me?". The album was reissued in the UK on 26 March 2001. Hot Shot went on to be certified six-times platinum in the United States by the RIAA, and was the second best-selling album of 2001 in that country (behind Linkin Park's Hybrid Theory). The album has sold over nine million copies worldwide. A remix album, titled Hot Shot Ultramix, was released in June 2002. Four singles were released from the album: "It Wasn't Me", "Angel", "Luv Me, Luv Me" and the double A-side single "Dance & Shout / Hope".

Hot Shot was the second highest-charting studio album of 2001 on the Billboard Year-End chart; it was also the best-selling album of 2001 in Canada.

== Track listing ==
No.	Title	Lyrics	Music	Producer(s)	Length
1.	"Hot Shot"	Orville Burrell; Dorret Wisdom	Christopher Birch; Shaun Pizzonia	Christopher Birch; Shaun "Sting" Pizzonia (co.)	3:47
2.	"Lonely Lover"	Burrell	James Harris III; Terry Lewis; John Freeman; Bobby Eli; Vinnie Barrett	Jimmy Jam & Terry Lewis	3:46
3.	"Dance & Shout" (featuring Pee Wee)	Burrell	Harris; Lewis; Michael Jackson; Randy Jackson	Jimmy Jam & Terry Lewis	3:47
4.	"Leave It to Me" (featuring Brian & Tony Gold)	Burrell; Brian Thompson	Gordon Dukes; Robert Livingston	Robert Livingston	3:37
5.	"Angel" (featuring Rayvon)	Burrell	Steve Miller; Ahmet Ertegun; Eddie Curtis; Chip Taylor	Shaun "Sting" Pizzonia	3:55
6.	"Hope" (featuring Mister Mydas)	Burrell; Ricardo Ducent	Thompson; Livingston	Robert Livingston	3:47
7.	"Keep'n It Real"	Burrell; Ducent	Dukes; Pizzonia	Gordon Dukes; Shaggy; Shaun "Sting" Pizzonia (add.)	3:55
8.	"Luv Me, Luv Me" (featuring Samantha Cole)	Burrell; Alex Richbourg	Harris; Lewis; Roy Hammond; Norman Whitfield	Jimmy Jam & Terry Lewis	3:36
9.	"Freaky Girl" (featuring The Kraft)	Burrell; Ducent; Nigel Staff	Eddie Drennon; Pizzonia; Morrison	Shaun "Sting" Pizzonia	3:44
10.	"It Wasn't Me" (featuring Ricardo "Rikrok" Ducent)	Burrell; Ducent	Pizzonia; Thompson	Shaun "Sting" Pizzonia	3:47
11.	"Not Fair" (featuring "Rude")	Burrell; Ducent; Staff	Thompson; Dave Kelly	Dave Kelly	3:47
12.	"Hey Love"	Burrell; Ducent	Thompson; D. Kelly; Pizzonia	Shaun "Sting" Pizzonia	4:01
13.	"Why Me Lord?"	Burrell; Ducent	Tony Kelly	Tony "CD" Kelly	3:34
14.	"Chica Bonita" (featuring Ricardo "Rikrok" Ducent)	Burrell; Ducent; Staff	Pizzonia	Shaun "Sting" Pizzonia	4:01
15.	"Dance & Shout" (video)

Special UK edition
No.	Title	Writer(s)	Producer(s)	Length
1.	"Hot Shot"			3:49
2.	"Lonely Lover"			3:46
3.	"It Wasn't Me" (featuring Ricardo "Rikrok" Ducent)			3:47
4.	"Freaky Girl" (featuring The Kraft)			3:44
5.	"Leave It to Me" (featuring Brian & Tony Gold)			3:37
6.	"Angel" (featuring Rayvon)			3:55
7.	"Hope" (featuring Mister Mydas)			3:47
8.	"Keep'n It Real"			3:55
9.	"Luv Me, Luv Me" (featuring Samantha Cole)			3:36
10.	"Not Fair" (featuring "Rude")			3:47
11.	"Hey Love"			4:01
12.	"Why Me Lord?"			3:34
13.	"Joy You Bring" (featuring Brian & Tony Gold)	D. Kelly; Burrell	Dave Kelly	3:28
14.	"Chica Bonita" (featuring Ricardo "Rikrok" Ducent)			4:01
15.	"Dance & Shout" (Dancehall Version; featuring Pee Wee)			4:27
16.	"Why You Mad at Me?"	Burrell; Dukes; Ducent	Gordon Dukes	3:12
17.	"Dance & Shout" (Klub Kings Radio Edit; video)
18.	"It Wasn't Me" (video)

Hot Shot Ultramix
No.	Title	Writer(s)	Producer(s)	Length
1.	"It Wasn't Me" (Punch Mix; featuring Ricardo "Rikrok" Ducent)			3:55
2.	"Special Request" (Rough Out Demo; featuring Ricardo "Rikrok" Ducent)	T. Kelly; Burrell; Ducent	Tony "CD "Kelly	3:33
3.	"Freaky Girl" (Strip Mix; featuring The Kraft)			3:48
4.	"Too Hot to Handle" (featuring Robin)	Burrell; Ducent; Birch	Christopher Birch; Shaggy	4:57
5.	"Why You Mad at Me?"			3:12
6.	"Keep'n It Real" (Swingers Mix)			3:32
7.	"Leave It to Me" (Early Mix; featuring Brian & Tony Gold)			4:01
8.	"Chica Bonita" (Player's Mix; featuring Ricardo "Rikrok" Ducent)			4:09
9.	"It Wasn't Me" (The Cartel Mix; featuring Ricardo "Rikrok" Ducent, Nucci Rey O, and Wiz Dinero)			3:45
10.	"Dance & Shout" (Dance Hall Mix; featuring Pee Wee)			4:27
11.	"Hope" (Dukes Mix; featuring Prince Midas)			4:03
12.	"Angel" (live; featuring Rayvon and Brian & Tony Gold)			5:31
13.	"Dance & Shout" (Klub Kings Klub Mix – Radio Edit; featuring Pee Wee)			3:34

Sample credits

- "Lonely Lover" contains elements from "Just Don't Want to Be Lonely", written by Vinnie Barrett, Bobby Eli, and John Freeman; performed by the Main Ingredient.
- "Dance & Shout" contains a sample of "Shake Your Body (Down to the Ground)", written by Michael Jackson and Randy Jackson; performed by the Jacksons.
- "Angel" contains samples from "The Joker", written by Steve Miller, Ahmet Ertegun, and Eddie Curtis; and "Angel of the Morning", written by Chip Taylor.
- "Luv Me, Luv Me" contains elements from "Impeach the President", written by Roy Hammond and performed by the Honey Drippers. It also contains reusing elements from "Ooh Boy", written by Norman Whitfield.
- "Freaky Girl" contains a sample from "Let's Do the Latin Hustle", written by Eddie Drennon.

== Charts ==
=== Weekly charts ===
Weekly chart performance for Hot Shot
Chart (2001)	Peak position
Australian Albums (ARIA)	2
Australian Urban Albums (ARIA)	1
Austrian Albums (Ö3 Austria)	2
Belgian Albums (Ultratop Flanders)	9
Belgian Albums (Ultratop Wallonia)	23
Canadian Albums (Billboard)	1
Canadian R&B Albums (Nielsen SoundScan)	1
Danish Albums (Hitlisten)	5
Dutch Albums (Album Top 100)	3
Finnish Albums (Suomen virallinen lista)	6
French Albums (SNEP)	5
German Albums (Offizielle Top 100)	1
Hungarian Albums (MAHASZ)	24
Irish Albums (IRMA)	4
Italian Albums (FIMI)	20
New Zealand Albums (RMNZ)	1
Norwegian Albums (VG-lista)	12
Portuguese Albums (AFP)	1
Scottish Albums (OCC)	2
Spanish Albums (PROMUSICAE)	20
Swedish Albums (Sverigetopplistan)	6
Swiss Albums (Schweizer Hitparade)	2
UK Albums (OCC)	1
US Billboard 200	1
US Top R&B/Hip-Hop Albums (Billboard)	1

=== Year-end charts ===
2000 year-end chart performance for Hot Shot
Chart (2000)	Position
Canadian Albums (Nielsen SoundScan)	62

2001 year-end chart performance for Hot Shot
Chart (2001)	Position
Australian Albums (ARIA)	6
Austrian Albums (Ö3 Austria)	20
Belgian Albums (Ultratop Flanders)	39
Belgian Albums (Ultratop Wallonia)	78
Canadian Albums (Nielsen SoundScan)	1
Canadian R&B Albums (Nielsen SoundScan)	1
Canadian Rap Albums (Nielsen SoundScan)	1
Dutch Albums (Album Top 100)	22
French Albums (SNEP)	55
German Albums (Offizielle Top 100)	10
Swedish Albums (Sverigetopplistan)	31
Swiss Albums (Schweizer Hitparade)	13
UK Albums (OCC)	11
US Billboard 200	2
US Top R&B/Hip-Hop Albums (Billboard)	2
Worldwide Albums (IFPI)	4

2002 year-end chart performance for Hot Shot
Chart (2002)	Position
Canadian Albums (Nielsen SoundScan)	152
Canadian R&B Albums (Nielsen SoundScan)	28
Canadian R&B Albums (Nielsen SoundScan) Hot Shot Ultramix	130
Canadian Rap Albums (Nielsen SoundScan)	14

== Certifications and sales ==
Certifications and sales for Hot Shot
Region	Certification	Certified units/sales
Australia (ARIA)	4× Platinum	280,000^{^}
Austria (IFPI Austria)	Gold	25,000^{*}
Belgium (BRMA)	Gold	25,000^{*}
Canada (Music Canada)	7× Platinum	700,000^{^}
Colombia	Gold	
Denmark (IFPI Danmark)	Gold	25,000^{^}
France (SNEP)	Gold	100,000^{*}
Germany (BVMI)	Platinum	300,000^{‡}
India	Platinum	
Indonesia	Gold	
Ireland (IRMA)	2× Platinum	30,000^{^}
Italy (FIMI)	Gold	50,000
Japan (RIAJ)	Gold	110,000
Malaysia	Platinum	
Mexico (AMPROFON)	Gold	75,000^{^}
Netherlands (NVPI)	Platinum	80,000^{^}
New Zealand (RMNZ)	5× Platinum	75,000^{^}
Norway (IFPI Norway)	Platinum	50,000^{*}
Philippines (PARI)	2× Platinum	80,000^{*}
Portugal (AFP)	2× Platinum	80,000^{^}
Singapore (RIAS)	Gold	7,500^{*}
South Africa (RISA)	Platinum	50,000^{*}
Spain (Promusicae)	Gold	50,000^{^}
Sweden (GLF)	Gold	40,000^{^}
Switzerland (IFPI Switzerland)	Platinum	50,000^{^}
Taiwan (RIT)	Gold	
United Kingdom (BPI)	3× Platinum	900,000^{^}
United States (RIAA)	6× Platinum	8,800,000
Summaries
Europe (IFPI)	2× Platinum	2,000,000^{*}
^{*} Sales figures based on certification alone.^{^} Shipments figures based on certification alone.^{‡} Sales+streaming figures based on certification alone.
