= It Wasn't Me =

2000 single by Shaggy featuring RikRok

Single by Shaggy featuring Ricardo "RikRok" Ducent

from the album Hot Shot
- B-side: "Dance & Shout"
- Released: 7 November 2000
- Studio: Ranch (Valley Stream, New York)
- Genre: Reggae
- Length: 3:47
- Label: MCA
- Songwriters: Orville Burrell; Rickardo Ducent; Shaun Pizzonia; Brian Thompson
- Producer: Shaun "Sting" Pizzonia

Shaggy singles chronology
"Luv Me, Luv Me" (1998)	"It Wasn't Me" (2000)	"Angel" (2001)

RikRok singles chronology
"It Wasn't Me" (2000)	"Your Eyes" (2004)

"It Wasn't Me" is the first single from Jamaican-American reggae musician Shaggy's fifth studio album, Hot Shot (2000). The song features vocals from British-Jamaican singer Rikrok (credited as Ricardo "RikRok" Ducent). The lyrics of the song depict one man (portrayed by RikRok) asking his friend (Shaggy) what to do after his girlfriend caught him cheating on her with "the girl next door". His friend's advice is to deny everything with the phrase "it wasn't me", despite clear evidence to the contrary.

"It Wasn't Me" was serviced to American contemporary hit radio on 7 November 2000 and has been regarded as Shaggy's breakthrough in the pop market. The single topped the charts in Australia, Flanders, France, Ireland, the Netherlands, Poland, the United Kingdom, and the United States. It was the best-selling single of 2001 in the UK, selling over 1.15 million copies that year and over 1.42 million as of 2017.

== Background ==
The lyrics of "It Wasn't Me" depict one man asking his friend what to do after his girlfriend catches him having sex with another woman. His friend's advice is to deny everything, despite clear evidence to the contrary, with the phrase "It wasn't me". Ultimately, the narrator says that the advice "makes no sense at all" and decides to confess and apologize. It is written in the key of C major.

The song was inspired by a bit called "No Loyal Men", performed by Eddie Murphy in his comedy special Raw (1987). In an interview in February 2016, Shaggy acknowledged an interpolation of the War song "Smile Happy". The connection is further supported by two later songs that are based on "It Wasn't Me": British singer Liam Payne's 2017 debut single "Strip That Down" (featuring Quavo) from his album LP1, which interpolates the song, and the 2019 song "China" by Puerto Rican rappers Anuel AA and Daddy Yankee and Colombian singer Karol G with Puerto Rican singer Ozuna and Colombian singer J Balvin from the album Emmanuel, which samples the song. Both of these songs credited Shaggy (as Orville Burrell), the others writers of "It Wasn't Me", and members of War (despite their song not appearing on either track) as co-songwriters.

The clean version of the song replaces the lyric "Picture this: we were both butt-naked banging on the bathroom floor" with "Picture this: we were both caught making love on the bathroom floor" and "Saw me banging on the sofa" with "Saw me kissing on the sofa".

"It Wasn't Me" was originally never intended to be released as a single. Before the original version of Hot Shot was released in August 2000, Hawaiian DJ Pablo Sato downloaded the album from "a Napster like MP3 site he won't name" and discovered that "It Wasn't Me" was "the album's standout cut". He played the song on American radio the next day, and in an interview, claimed, "The phone lines lit up right away. Within a couple of days, it was our number-one requested song." The song was released to radio on 7 November 2000, then was given a retail release on 6 February 2001 following its airplay success.

== Chart performance ==
"It Wasn't Me" was Shaggy's first number-one hit in the United States. The song reached number two on 23 December 2000. On 30 December, it was bumped down one position to number three. It moved back up to the number-two spot on 13 January 2001, then, on 3 February, it ascended to number one, replacing Destiny's Child's "Independent Women Part I". The song remained at number one for two weeks and spent 25 weeks on the chart altogether.

The song also reached number one on the UK Singles Chart on 4 March 2001, selling 345,000 copies, making the song a transatlantic chart topper. It also reached number one in Australia on 1 April 2001. It is also the 11th biggest selling single of the 21st century in the United Kingdom, with sales of over 1.42 million as of September 2017.

As of August 2014, it is the 49th-best-selling single of the 21st century in France, with 399,500 units sold.

== Music video ==
The music video was directed by Stephen Scott. It begins with RikRok running to Shaggy's mansion to explain to him what has just happened. RikRok tells him that he cheated on his girlfriend and got caught. Shaggy tells him to tell her that "It wasn't me." The video then cuts into a flashback to earlier that day. RikRok has been caught sleeping with another woman, and his girlfriend is outside the apartment in her convertible when two women pull up next to her on their sport bikes.

Then, the three women go into the building. He then sneaks out the window, takes the motorcycle of one of his girlfriend's accomplices and leaves. The women come out and the girlfriend and one of her accomplices get in the convertible and the other gets on her motorcycle and they chase after him. From his mansion, Shaggy, using his futuristic technology, tracks down where RikRok is going and prepares an escape for him. RikRok then gets on a bridge over the highway when the accomplice rode on the bridge in front of him.

He then hits the brakes to stop while she stops her motorcycle. RikRok then hears a noise behind him and it is the other accomplices and the girlfriend driving the convertible on the other side of the bridge with the highway down below. An eighteen-wheeler drives by, and Shaggy leaves RikRok a text message telling him to look behind and he notices the truck and jumps off the side of overhead and lands on the truck. He is then dropped off at Shaggy's mansion, showing the same scene from the start of the video.

== Legacy ==
"It Wasn't Me" was one of American singer Michael Jackson's favorite songs and he had Shaggy perform it at his 30th anniversary concert show in 2001. Shaggy later told the Hot Morning Crew radio show that when the two met, Jackson told him the song sounded like something he would write, which prompted Shaggy to quip, "So you be bangin', huh?"

The lyrical content of "It Wasn't Me" inspired Slate writer Josh Levin to coin the term the "Shaggy defense" to describe R. Kelly's defense at his 2008 child pornography trial stemming from the production of a sex tape: "I predict that in the decades to come, law schools will teach this as the 'Shaggy defense'. You allege that I was caught on camera, butt naked, banging on the log cabin floor? It wasn't me." R. Kelly was ultimately found not guilty on those charges. Levin repeated the term on NPR, and "Shaggy defense" entered common use to describe a defendant flatly denying guilt despite overwhelming evidence against them.

The song was spoofed by Bob Rivers, as "Caught Me One Handed", and makes a reference to the Scooby-Doo character, Shaggy Rogers. The video focused on him being caught masturbating (about the girl next door) by his mother. The song was also spoofed on Svengoolie. On The Chris Moyles Show, the song was used as a prank call with "Shaggy" (actually impressionist Jon Culshaw) trying to book a taxi, with the final line being "Can you drop me off at The Chris Moyles Show on BBC Radio 1?, 97 to 99 FM".

== Track listings ==
- Jamaican 7-inch single

A. "It Wasn't Me"
B. "It Wasn't Me" (club mix)

- US 7-inch single

A. "It Wasn't Me" (album version) – 3:48
B. "It Wasn't Me" (vocal club) – 4:10

- US CD single
1. "It Wasn't Me" (album version)
2. "It Wasn't Me" (Squeaky version)
3. "It Wasn't Me" (instrumental version)
4. "It Wasn't Me" (Sports version)
- US 12-inch single

A1. "It Wasn't Me" (vocal 12-inch mix) – 3:49
A2. "It Wasn't Me" (vocal 12-inch mix instrumental) – 3:49
B1. "It Wasn't Me" (Punch remix) – 3:54
B2. "It Wasn't Me" (album version) – 3:47

- European CD single
1. "It Wasn't Me" (radio edit) – 3:43
2. "It Wasn't Me" (vocal 12-inch mix) – 3:49
- UK CD single and Australian CD1
1. "It Wasn't Me" (radio edit) – 3:43
2. "It Wasn't Me" (vocal 12-inch mix) – 3:49
3. "Dance & Shout" (Pussy 2000 club mix edit) – 8:07
4. "It Wasn't Me" (enhanced video)
- UK 12-inch single

A1. "It Wasn't Me" (radio edit) – 3:43
A2. "It Wasn't Me" (album version) – 3:47
B1. "It Wasn't Me" (12-inch vocal) – 3:49

- UK cassette single
1. "It Wasn't Me" (radio edit) – 3:43
2. "It Wasn't Me" (album version) – 3:47
- Australian CD2
1. "It Wasn't Me" (radio edit) – 3:43
2. "It Wasn't Me" (vocal 12-inch mix) – 3:49
3. "It Wasn't Me" (Crash & Burn remix) – 5:37
4. "Dance & Shout" (Pussy 2000 club mix edit) – 8:07
5. "Dance & Shout" (Kulb Kings club mix) – 6:30
6. "It Wasn't Me" (enhanced video)

== Credits and personnel ==
Credits are taken from the Hot Shot album booklet.

Studios

- Recorded and mixed at Ranch Recording Studios (Valley Stream, New York)
- Mastered at Sterling Sound (New York City)

Personnel

- Shaggy – writing (as Orville Burrell)
- Ricardo "RikRok" Ducent – writing (as Rickardo Ducent)
- Shaun "Sting" Pizzonia – writing, background vocals, drums, production, recording, mixing
- Brian Thompson – writing
- Brian and Tony Gold – background vocals
- Robert Zapata – guitar
- Nigel Staff – keyboard
- Jerry Johnson – brass
- Kevin Batchelor – brass
- Gwen Laster – violin
- Chris Gehringer – mastering

== Charts ==
=== Weekly charts ===
Chart (2000–2001)	Peak position
Australia (ARIA)	1
Australian Urban (ARIA)	1
Austria (Ö3 Austria Top 40)	3
Belgium (Ultratop 50 Flanders)	1
Belgium (Ultratop 50 Wallonia)	2
Canada (Nielsen SoundScan)	18
Canada CHR (Nielsen BDS)	1
Croatia (HRT)	1
Denmark (Tracklisten)	2
Europe (Eurochart Hot 100)	1
Finland (Suomen virallinen lista)	11
France (SNEP)	1
Germany (GfK)	4
Hungary (Mahasz)	8
Ireland (IRMA)	1
Italy (FIMI)	2
Netherlands (Dutch Top 40)	1
Netherlands (Single Top 100)	1
New Zealand (Recorded Music NZ)	6
Norway (VG-lista)	2
Poland Airplay (Music & Media)	1
Portugal (AFP)	3
Scottish Singles Sales (Official Charts)	1
Spain (Promusicae)	13
Sweden (Sverigetopplistan)	2
Switzerland (Schweizer Hitparade)	2
UK Singles (Official Charts)	1
UK Hip Hop/R&B (Official Charts)	1
US Billboard Hot 100	1
US Hot R&B/Hip-Hop Songs (Billboard)	3
US Hot Rap Songs (Billboard)	1
US Pop Airplay (Billboard)	1
US Rhythmic Airplay (Billboard)	1

=== Year-end charts ===
Chart (2000)	Position
US Rhythmic Top 40 (Billboard)	50

Chart (2001)	Position
Australia (ARIA)	2
Australian Urban (ARIA)	1
Austria (Ö3 Austria Top 40)	25
Belgium (Ultratop 50 Flanders)	6
Belgium (Ultratop 50 Wallonia)	6
Brazil (Crowley)	7
Canada (Nielsen SoundScan)	113
Canada Radio (Nielsen BDS)	82
Europe (Eurochart Hot 100)	3
France (SNEP)	7
Germany (Media Control)	20
Ireland (IRMA)	2
Netherlands (Dutch Top 40)	7
Netherlands (Single Top 100)	6
Sweden (Hitlistan)	25
Switzerland (Schweizer Hitparade)	17
UK Singles (OCC)	1
UK Urban (Music Week)	37
US Billboard Hot 100	12
US Hot R&B/Hip-Hop Singles & Tracks (Billboard)	34
US Hot Rap Singles (Billboard)	5
US Mainstream Top 40 (Billboard)	18
US Rhythmic Top 40 (Billboard)	17

=== Decade-end charts ===
Chart (2000–2009)	Position
Australia (ARIA)	62
Netherlands (Single Top 100)	29
UK Singles (OCC)	4
US Billboard Hot 100	81

=== All-time charts ===
Chart	Position
Ireland (IRMA)	12
UK Singles (OCC)	49

== Certifications ==
Region	Certification	Certified units/sales
Australia (ARIA)	3× Platinum	210,000^{^}
Austria (IFPI Austria)	Gold	25,000^{*}
Belgium (BRMA)	Platinum	50,000^{*}
Denmark (IFPI Danmark)	Platinum	8,000^{^}
Denmark (IFPI Danmark)	Gold	45,000^{‡}
France (SNEP)	Platinum	500,000^{*}
Germany (BVMI)	Platinum	600,000^{‡}
Italy (FIMI) since 2009	Gold	25,000^{‡}
Netherlands (NVPI)	Platinum	60,000^{^}
New Zealand (RMNZ)	7× Platinum	210,000^{‡}
Norway (IFPI Norway)	Platinum	
Sweden (GLF)	Platinum	30,000^{^}
Switzerland (IFPI Switzerland)	Gold	20,000^{^}
United Kingdom (BPI)	5× Platinum	3,000,000^{‡}
^{*} Sales figures based on certification alone.^{^} Shipments figures based on certification alone.^{‡} Sales+streaming figures based on certification alone.

== Release history ==
Region	Date	Format(s)	Label(s)	Ref(s).
United States	7 November 2000	Contemporary hit radio	MCA	
United States	14 November 2000	Urban contemporary radio	MCA	
United States	7 February 2001	Maxi-CD	MCA	
Australia	26 February 2001	CD1	MCA	
United Kingdom	26 February 2001	12-inch vinyl; CD; cassette	MCA	
Australia	23 April 2001	CD2	MCA	

== See also ==
- Alternative facts
- List of Billboard Hot 100 number-one singles of 2001
- List of best-selling singles and albums of 2001 in Ireland
- List of best-selling singles of the 2000s (decade) in the United Kingdom
- List of best-selling singles of the 2000s (century) in the United Kingdom
- List of million-selling singles in the United Kingdom
- List of 2000s UK Singles Chart number ones
- Shaggy defense
