= Luv Me, Luv Me =

1998 single by Shaggy

Single by Shaggy featuring Janet Jackson (original version) or Samantha Cole (re-recorded version)

from the album How Stella Got Her Groove Back: Music from the Motion Picture (original version) and Hot Shot (re-recorded version)
- B-side: "Why You Treat Me So Bad"
- Released: 1998 (original version); 2001 (re-recorded version)
- Recorded: 1998 (original version); 2000 (re-recorded version)
- Genre: Reggae fusion
- Length: 5:56 (original version); 3:30 (re-recorded version)
- Label: MCA; Geffen
- Songwriters: Orville "Shaggy" Burrell; Roy Hammond; Alexander Richbourg; Norman Whitfield; Terry Lewis
- Producer: Jimmy Jam and Terry Lewis

Shaggy singles chronology
"Piece of My Heart" (1997)	"Luv Me, Luv Me" (1998)	"It Wasn't Me" (2000)
"Angel" (2000)	""Luv Me, Luv Me" (re-release)" (2001)	"Dance & Shout / Hope" (2001)

Janet Jackson singles chronology
"Go Deep" (1998)	"Luv Me, Luv Me" (1998)	"You" (1998)

"Luv Me, Luv Me" is a song by Jamaican-American reggae singer Shaggy. It was first released in 1998 with Janet Jackson credited as a featured artist. The song was re-recorded in 2000 with Samantha Cole's vocals after Jackson's label withheld the song from being included on Shaggy's next album. It was released in 2001 as the third official single from his 2000 album Hot Shot.

== History ==
The song "Luv Me, Luv Me" was originally recorded in 1998 as a duet between Janet Jackson and Shaggy, to be featured on the motion picture soundtrack to How Stella Got Her Groove Back (1998). The song originally sampled "Impeach the President" (1973) by The Honey Drippers, with the chorus of Rose Royce's "Ooh Boy" sung by Jackson ("Ooh, boy, I love you so; never, ever gonna let you go…once I get my hands on you" and "…I hope you feel the same way, too"). The music video features Whoopi Goldberg, Regina King, Angela Bassett and Taye Diggs, stars of the film, making cameos. Shaggy later described working with Jackson as "the worst experience of his musical career", claiming she "didn't want to cooperate" and was "a complete nightmare". The version of the song with Janet Jackson was ultimately released with the How Stella Got Her Groove Back soundtrack. However, when Shaggy announced he wanted to include the track on his subsequent studio album, which would eventually be titled Hot Shot (2000), Jackson's label, Virgin Records, withheld the rights to her vocals, essentially nullifying the track for inclusion on Shaggy's album; ultimately, Shaggy would go on to re-record the song, as he wanted to include it on the record, albeit with new vocals by Samantha Cole. It was Cole's version that was included on Hot Shot and was released to radio stations as a single. Although the version featuring Janet Jackson did receive some initial airplay in 1998, it was later shelved for Cole's version, but later included on Shaggy's greatest hits album, Mr. Lover Lover – The Best of Shaggy... Part 1 (2002).

== Chart performance ==
Billboard changed their chart policies near the end of 1998, allowing tracks without a commercial release to chart and rank within their system. This resulted in "Luv Me, Luv Me" debuting on the Billboard Hot 100 in December 1998 due to airplay alone. However, despite its popularity, the song only peaked at No. 76 in the US, ending Janet Jackson's record-breaking streak of 18 consecutive top 10 hits on the Billboard Hot 100. Internationally, the song was a hit, reaching No. 4 in Belgium and Ireland, No. 5 in the UK, and No. 10 in Australia, along with the top 40 or top 20 chart placings in several other countries.

== Track listings ==
- UK
1. "Luv Me, Luv Me" (featuring Samantha Cole) (radio mix) – 3:28
2. "Luv Me, Luv Me" (featuring Samantha Cole) (album version) – 3:50
3. "It Wasn't Me" (Crash and Burn Remix) – 5:37
- Europe
1. "Luv Me, Luv Me" (featuring Samantha Cole) (radio mix) – 3:28
2. "Why You Treat Me So Bad" – 3:14
3. "Angel" (dancehall remix) – 5:32
4. "Luv Me, Luv Me" (featuring Samantha Cole) (video)
- France
1. "Luv Me, Luv Me" (featuring Samantha Cole) (radio mix) – 3:28
2. "Luv Me, Luv Me" (featuring Samantha Cole) (album version) – 3:50
3. "Angel" (dancehall remix) – 5:32
4. "Angel" (live version) – 4:17

== Charts ==
=== Weekly charts ===
Chart (1998–2001)	Peak position
Australia (ARIA)	10
Australian Urban (ARIA)	5
Austria (Ö3 Austria Top 40)	23
Belgium (Ultratop 50 Flanders)	15
Belgium (Ultratip Bubbling Under Wallonia)	4
Canada Top Singles (RPM)	36
Canada Contemporary Hit Radio (BDS)	32
France (SNEP)	60
Germany (GfK)	36
Iceland (Íslenski Listinn Topp 40); 1998 version	10
Ireland (IRMA)	4
Netherlands (Dutch Top 40)	27
Netherlands (Single Top 100)	24
New Zealand (Recorded Music NZ)	34
Norway (VG-lista)	14
Portugal (AFP)	9
Romania (Romanian Top 100)	23
Scottish Singles Sales (Official Charts)	6
Sweden (Sverigetopplistan)	25
Switzerland (Schweizer Hitparade)	13
UK Singles (Official Charts)	5
US Billboard Hot 100; 1998 version	76
US Pop Airplay (Billboard); 1998 version	23
US R&B/Hip-Hop Airplay (Billboard); 1998 version	44
US Rhythmic Airplay (Billboard); 1998 version	22

=== Year-end charts ===
Chart (2001)	Position
Australia (ARIA)	51
Ireland (IRMA)	73
Switzerland (Schweizer Hitparade)	91
UK Singles (OCC)	93
