= Thank You for Arguing: What Aristotle, Lincoln, and Homer Simpson Can Teach Us About the Art of Persuasion =

2007 book by Jay Heinrichs

- Author: Jay Heinrichs
- Genre: Non-fiction
- Publisher: Three Rivers Press
- Publication date: 2007
- ISBN: 9780307341440

Thank You for Arguing: What Aristotle, Lincoln, and Homer Simpson Can Teach Us About the Art of Persuasion is a New York Times bestselling non-fiction book by Jay Heinrichs. It is on its 4th edition. The book covers the history of rhetoric and uses modern examples of how persuasion is used in politics, advertising, and the media as well as how to teach a child to argue.
