= Dance & Shout / Hope =

2000 single by Shaggy

"Dance & Shout" / "Hope"

Single by Shaggy

from the album Hot Shot
- Released: 23 November 1999 ("Hope"); 11 July 2000 ("Dance & Shout"); 19 November 2001 (worldwide)
- Recorded: 1999
- Genre: Reggae fusion
- Length: 3:46 ("Dance & Shout"); 3:45 ("Hope")
- Label: MCA
- Songwriters: Shaggy; Shaun Pizzonia; Braun Thompson
- Producer: Shaun Pizzonia

Shaggy singles chronology
"Luv Me, Luv Me" (2001)	"Dance & Shout" / "Hope" (1999)	"Me Julie" (2002)

"Dance & Shout" / "Hope" is the fourth and final official single from Shaggy's multi-platinum studio album Hot Shot, released on 19 November 2001. The single was made up of two tracks that had previously been released as singles in exclusive territories. "Dance & Shout" samples "Shake Your Body (Down to the Ground)" by The Jacksons.

== Background ==
"Hope" was a song first recorded for the soundtrack of the film For Love of the Game, and was released as a single from the soundtrack exclusively in America on 23 November 1999, however, to no commercial success. "Dance & Shout" was released as a preceding single to Hot Shot exclusively in Europe on 11 July 2000, achieving only minor success; however, the song peaked at number 42 on the ARIA Singles Chart and number four on the Bubbling Under Billboard Hot 100 chart due to import sales. In November 2001, following the release of the three official worldwide singles from Hot Shot—"It Wasn't Me", "Angel" and "Luv Me, Luv Me", both "Dance & Shout" and "Hope" were re-released as a double A-side for all territories.

== Track listing ==
- UK
1. "Dance & Shout" (Shark Radio Edit) – 3:11
2. "Hope" (Album Version) – 3:45
3. "Dance & Shout" (Klub Kings Remix) – 6:30
- Europe
1. "Dance & Shout" (Shark Radio Edit) – 3:11
2. "Dance & Shout" (Klub Kings Radio Edit) – 3:34
3. "Hope" (Album Version) – 3:45
4. "Dance & Shout" (Klub Kings Remix Video)
- Australia
1. "Dance & Shout" (Shark Radio Edit) – 3:11
2. "Hope" (Album Version) – 3:45
3. "Why You Mad At Me" – 3:16
4. "Hope" (Enhanced Video)

Non-double A-side releases prior to single

- Hope (America)

Main single

1. "Hope" (LP Version) – 4:06
2. "Not Fair" – 3:34
3. "Hope" (Remix) – 4:23

For the Love of the Game soundtrack single

1. "Hope" (Radio Edit) – 3:28
2. "Hope" (LP Version) – 4:06
- Dance & Shout (Europe)

CD single

1. "Dance & Shout" (Shark Radio Edit) – 3:11
2. "Dance & Shout" (Klub Kings Remix) – 6:30
3. "Dance & Shout" (Pussy 2000 Club Mix) – 8:14
4. "Dance & Shout" (MPC's Mix) – 5:55

Limited edition enhanced single

1. "Dance & Shout" (Shark Radio Edit) – 3:11
2. "Dance & Shout" (Dancehall Version) – 3:46
3. "Dance & Shout" (Klub Kings Remix) – 6:30
4. "Dance & Shout" (Pussy 2000 Club Mix) – 8:14
5. "Dance & Shout" (MPC's Mix) – 5:55
6. "Dance & Shout" (Klub Kings Remix Video)

== Charts ==
Chart performance for "Dance & Shout" / "Hope"
Chart (2000–2002)	Peak position
Australia (ARIA)	52
Belgium (Ultratip Bubbling Under Wallonia)	16
Canada Top Singles (RPM)	12
Canada Dance/Urban (RPM)	17 (Note: "Dance & Shout" reached number 17 when RPM ceased publication in November 2000.)
Germany (GfK)	52
Ireland (IRMA)	25
Italy (FIMI)	29
Netherlands (Single Top 100)	85
Scottish Singles Sales (Official Charts)	20
Switzerland (Schweizer Hitparade)	75
UK Singles (Official Charts)	19
US Billboard Bubbling Under Hot 100 Singles	4
US Billboard Pop Songs	24
