= Twinkie defense =

Mocking term for improbable legal defense

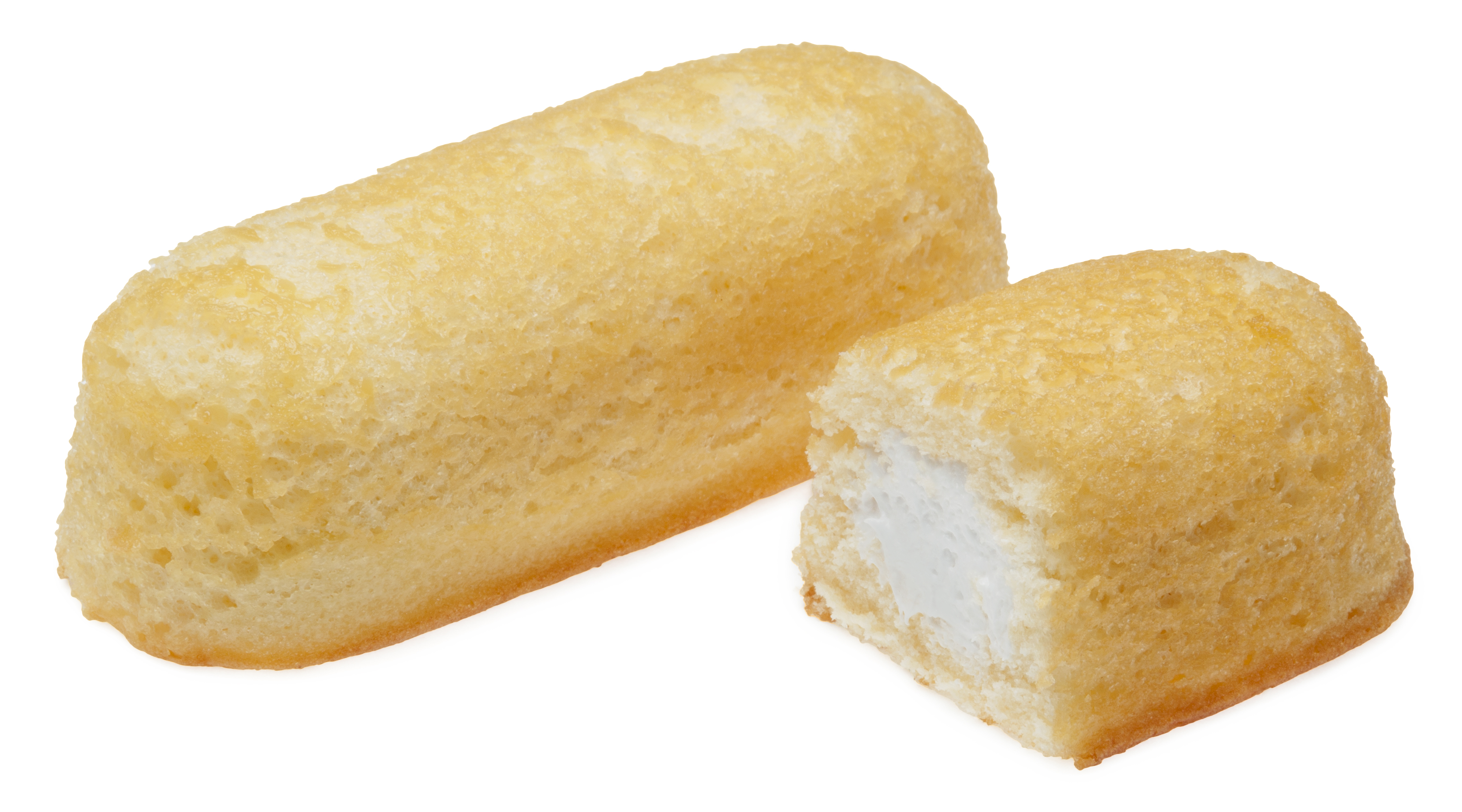
A Twinkie

"Twinkie defense" is a derisive label for an improbable legal defense. It is not a recognized legal defense in jurisprudence, but a catch-all term coined by reporters during their coverage of the trial of defendant Dan White for the murders of San Francisco city supervisor Harvey Milk and Mayor George Moscone. White's defense was that he suffered diminished capacity as a result of his depression, a symptom of which was a change in diet from healthy food to Twinkies and other sugary foods. Contrary to common belief, White's attorneys did not argue that the Twinkies were the cause of White's actions, but that their consumption was symptomatic of his underlying depression. The product itself was only mentioned in passing during the trial. White was convicted of voluntary manslaughter rather than first-degree murder, and served five years in prison.

== Origin ==
The expression derives from the 1979 trial of Dan White, a former San Francisco police officer and firefighter who was serving as a city district supervisor up until assassinating Mayor George Moscone and Supervisor Harvey Milk on November 27, 1978. At the trial, psychiatrist Martin Blinder testified that White had been depressed at the time of the crime, and pointed to several behavioral changes indicating White's depression: he had quit his job; he shunned his wife; and although normally clean-cut, he had become slovenly in appearance. Furthermore, White had previously been a fitness fanatic and health food advocate, but had begun consuming junk food and sugar-laden soft drinks like Coca-Cola. As an incidental note, Blinder mentioned theories that elements of diet could worsen existing mood swings. Another psychiatrist, George Solomon, testified that White had "exploded" and was "sort of on automatic pilot" at the time of the killings. The fact that White had killed Moscone and Milk was not challenged, but – in part because of the testimony from Blinder and other psychiatrists – the defense successfully convinced the jury that White's capacity for rational thought had been diminished; the jurors found White incapable of the premeditation required for a murder conviction, and instead convicted him of voluntary manslaughter. Public protests over the verdict led to the White Night Riots.

== Diminished capacity ==
Twinkies were only mentioned incidentally in the courtroom during the White trial, and junk food was a minor aspect of the defense presentation. The defense did not claim that White was on a sugar rush and committed the murders as a result. However, one reporter's use of the term "Twinkie defense" became popular, leading to a persistent misunderstanding by the public. The mistaken understanding was reiterated at the end of Milk, Gus Van Sant's 2008 biopic of Harvey Milk. In a bonus feature of The Times of Harvey Milk, a documentary on Milk's life and death which was re-released through The Criterion Collection, White's lawyers explain what they actually argued in court.

The actual legal defense that White's lawyers used was that his mental capacity had been diminished, and White's consumption of junk food was presented to the jury as one of many symptoms, not a cause, of White's depression.

In stories covering the trial, satirist Paul Krassner had played up the angle of the Twinkie, and he would later claim credit for coining the term "Twinkie defense". The day after the verdict, columnist Herb Caen wrote in the San Francisco Chronicle about the police support for White, himself a former policeman, and their "dislike of homosexuals" and mentioned "the Twinkie insanity defense" in passing. News stories published after the trial, however, frequently reported the defense arguments inaccurately, claiming that the defense had presented junk food as the cause of White's depression and/or diminished capacity, instead of having been symptomatic of an existing depression. Dan White committed suicide seven years later.

As a result of negative publicity from the White case and others, the term diminished capacity was abolished in 1982 by Proposition 8 and the California legislature and was replaced by the term diminished actuality, referring not to the capacity to have a specific intent, but to whether the defendant actually had the required intent to commit the crime. Additionally, California's statutory definitions of premeditation and malice required for murder were eliminated by the state's legislature, with the return to common law definitions. By this time, the "Twinkie defense" had become such a common term that one lawmaker had waved a Twinkie in the air while making his point during a debate.

== Supreme Court ==
During oral Supreme Court arguments in United States v. Gonzalez-Lopez, 548 U.S. 140 (2006), Justice Antonin Scalia referred to the Twinkie defense with regard to the right to counsel of choice as perhaps more important than the right to effective assistance of counsel: "I don't want a competent lawyer. I want a lawyer who's going to get me off. I want a lawyer who will invent the Twinkie defense. … I would not consider the Twinkie defense an invention of a competent lawyer. But I want a lawyer who's going to win for me".

== See also ==
- Affluenza
- Chewbacca defense
- The Dead Kennedys' version of "I Fought the Law", which is about the Milk–Moscone murders and includes a mention of the Twinkie defense ("Twinkies are the best friend I ever had").
- Gay panic defense
- The San Ysidro McDonald's massacre, blamed by the gunman's widow in part on monosodium glutamate in McDonald's food
- Trial and Error, a 1997 film in which an attorney attempts to increase his client's blood sugar so that he may use the Twinkie defense
