= Rayvon =

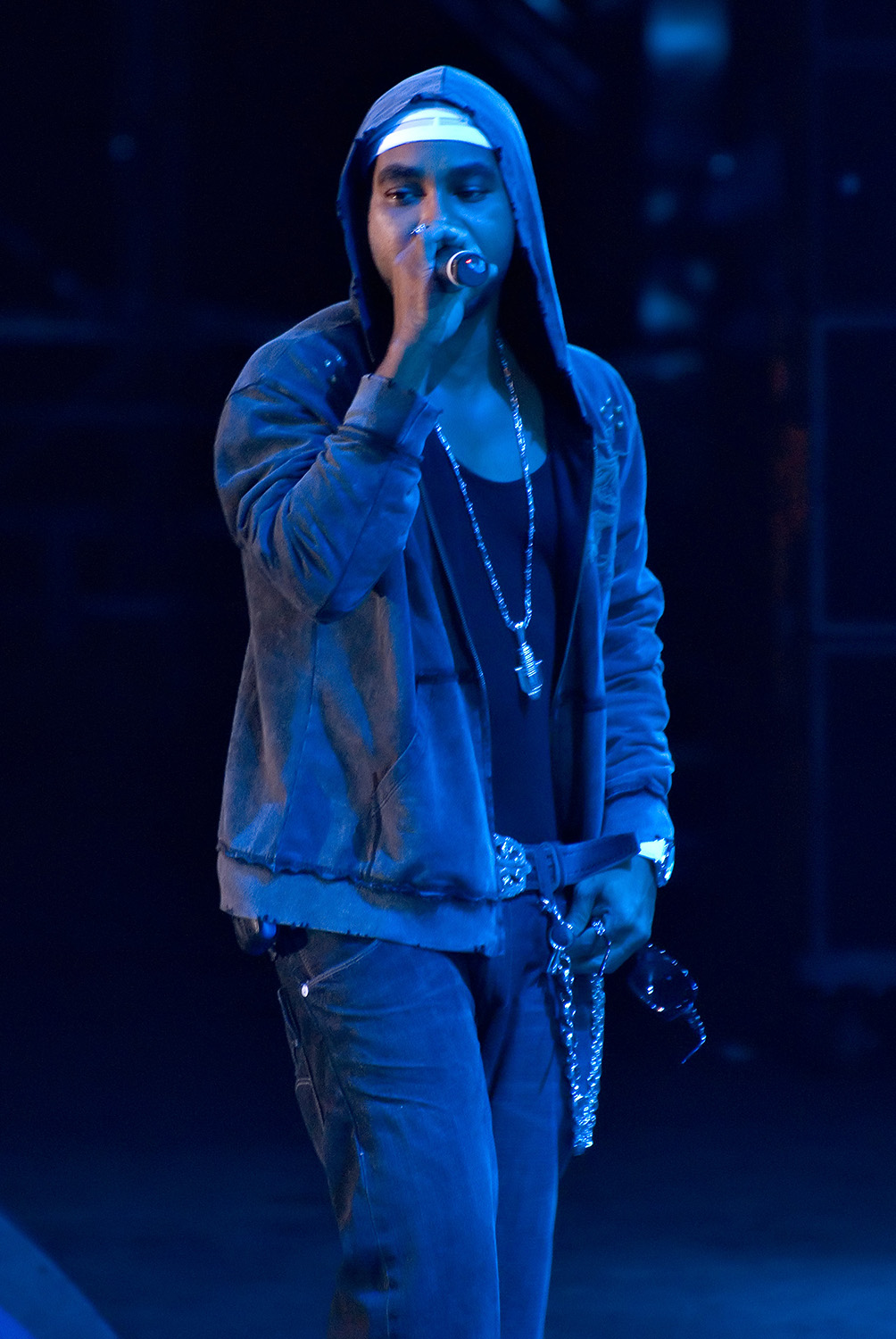
- Rayvon performing in 2007

Background information
- Born: Bruce Alexander Michael Brewster; January 18, 1968 (age 58); Barbados
- Origin: Brooklyn, New York City, U.S.
- Genres: Reggae; dancehall
- Occupations: Singer; songwriter
- Years active: 1991–present
- Labels: Virgin; EMI; GTC
- Website: 1rayvon.com

Bruce Alexander Michael Brewster (born January 18, 1968), better known by his stage name Rayvon, is a Barbadian singer and songwriter, known for his work with Shaggy.

Born in Barbados, he was raised in Brooklyn, New York City. He released his debut album, Hear My Cry in 1997. He had a hit in the United States in 1993 with "Big Up", which featured Shaggy, the first of a string of successful collaborations, which included "In the Summertime" and "Angel". His second album, My Bad, was released in 2002, by MCA Records.

Since then, Rayvon has stayed busy continuing to collaborate with his longtime friend Shaggy but also staying on road performing. Rayvon has also stayed steady releasing many other solo tracks and collaborations with others like Red Fox, General Degree, Luciano, and many more.

== Discography ==
=== Solo albums ===
- Hear My Cry (1997)
- My Bad (2002)
- Rayvon (2010)

=== Songs / singles ===
==== As main artist ====
- 1992: "Rivers of Babylon"
- 1994: "No Guns, No Murder" #94 US
- 1994: "Pretty / Before to Go to Bed" [VP Records]
- 1997: "Stallion Ride" (feat. Rhonda Davis) - [Virgin Records]
- 1997: "Bashment Party" (with Red Fox)
- 1998: "The Prong" (with Red Fox)
- 1998: "All Day All Night"
- 2002: "2-Way" #67 UK (feat. Shaggy & RikRok) [MCA]
- 2002: "My Bad" [MCA]
- 2004: "High Glade" [VP Records]
- 2004: "No Argument" [VP Records]
- 2010: "Back It Up" [GTC Entertainment]
- 2015: "One More Shot"
- 2010: "One N Only" (feat. Kobra Kohn & Beverly Marquis) [Prowax/GTC Entertainment]
- 2011: "Felony"
- 2012: "Wedding Song" (feat. Shaggy) - [GTC Entertainment]
- 2017: "Sugarcane" (with Sugar Bear)
- 2017: "Trouble Again"
- 2018: "Blaze Like a Fire" Redbull Riddim (with Redfox)
- 2019: "Now That We Found Love" (with Sugar Bear)
- 2019: "I See You" (with Sugar Bear)
- 2021: "Without You"
- 2022: "Roll It like a Big Fat Spliff" (with Sugar Bear)
- 2022: "I See You" Spanish Re-Mix (with Sugar Bear feat. Anivelpro)
- 2023: "Peace, Love & Understanding" (with Luciano & Sugar Bear)

==== As featured artist ====
- 1991: "Old Foot" (Shaggy & Rayvon)
- 1992: "Big Up" (Shaggy featuring Rayvon)
- 1993: "Nice and Lovely" (Shaggy & Rayvon) - [Virgin Records]
- 1994: "Girls Fresh" (Frankie Cutlass featuring Rayvon)
- 1995: "In the Summertime" (Shaggy featuring Rayvon) #5 UK [Virgin Records]
- 1995: "All Night Long" (Nayobe feat. Fat Joe and Rayvon) - [Fever Records]
- 2001: "Angel" (Shaggy featuring Rayvon) #1 US, #1 UK [MCA]
- 2007: "Out of Control" (Shaggy featuring Rayvon)
- 2011: "Selecta" (Kingston 13 Riddim)
- 2014: "Way Up" (Clarence Jey featuring Rayvon)
- 2013: "No Other Like You" (Musical Masquerade feat. Rayvon & R. Fox)
- 2015: "Nobody's Business" (Myra Flynn featuring Rayvon)
- 2015: "Magical (Your Love Is) (Fish & Bammy Riddim)
- 2016: "Can't Resist Your Touch" (Hypnotize Riddim)
- 2014: "Way Up" (Clarence Jey feat. Josef & Rayvon)
- 2016: "Nuff Tings" (Chanelle Gray feat. Rayvon)
- 2018: "Statement" (General Degree & Rayvon)
- 2019: "When She Loves Me" (Shaggy feat. Rayvon)
- 2020: "Turn Up Party" (DJ Epps feat. Rayvon)
- 2021: "Christmas in the Islands" (Shaggy & Rayvon)
- 2022: "Christmas in Paradise" (Laine feat. Rayvon)
- 2023: "If You Like Pina Coladas" (DJ Cassidy, Shaggy & Rayvon)
