= Rikrok =

British-Jamaican singer

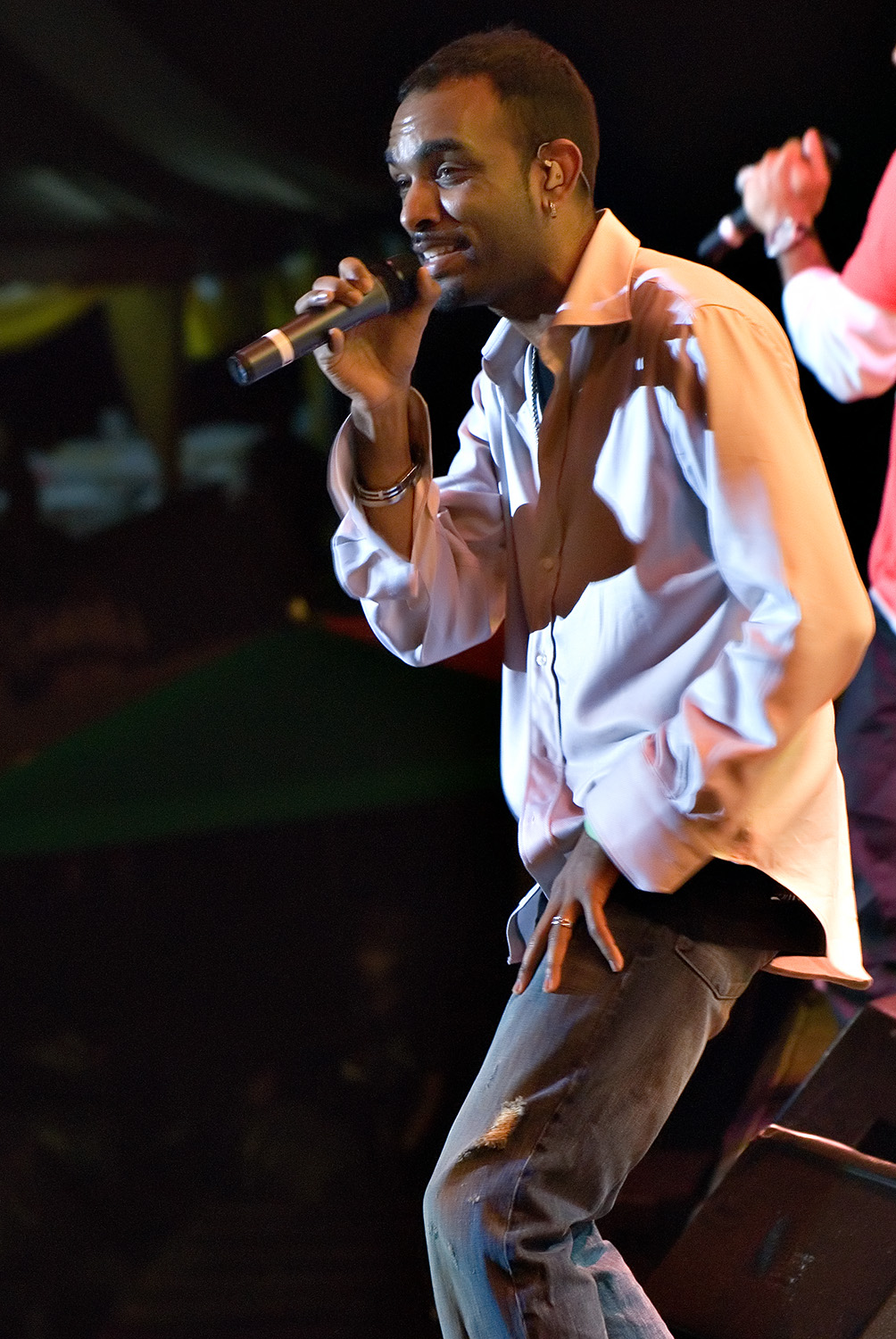
- Ducent in 2007

Background information
- Also known as: Rik Rok
- Born: Rickardo George Ducent; 1972 or 1973 (age 53–54); London, England
- Origin: Kingston, Jamaica
- Genres: Reggae fusion, R&B, pop
- Occupations: Singer, songwriter

Rickardo George Ducent (born 1972 or 1973) better known by his stage name RikRok, is a British-Jamaican singer, best known for his featured vocals on the 2000 international hit song "It Wasn't Me" by Shaggy.

== Early life and career ==
Born in London, but raised in Kingston, Rikrok began his musical career as a backing vocalist and songwriter. He worked with several artists in the Jamaican music scene before gaining international recognition.

=== Breakthrough with "It Wasn't Me" ===
In 2000, Rikrok collaborated with reggae artist Shaggy on the track "It Wasn't Me." The song, a comedy-reggae piece about a man caught cheating by his girlfriend, features Rikrok singing the song's hook and a bridge. The single became a worldwide commercial success, reaching number one on the US Billboard Hot 100 and various other charts globally. The song's popularity was a result of its humorous narrative and memorable hooks, which became a cultural standard.

Region	Date	Format(s)	Label(s)	Ref(s).
United States	7 November 2000	Contemporary hit radio	MCA	
United States	14 November 2000	Urban contemporary radio	MCA	
United States	7 February 2001	Maxi-CD	MCA	
Australia	26 February 2001	CD1	MCA	
United Kingdom	26 February 2001	12-inch vinyl; CD; cassette	MCA	
Australia	23 April 2001	CD2	MCA	

== Discography ==
- "It Wasn't Me" (2000) - featured vocalist on a single by Shaggy.
- "Pull Up" (2024) - featured vocalist on a single by Busy Signal.

== Personal life ==
According to Jamaica Observer in 2023, Ducent resides in the Caribbean.

=== Legal issues ===
In May 2025, Rikrok was involved in a legal dispute within his family over a £1 million inheritance belonging to Herbert Ducent, the father of Rikrok and his half-sister, Sarah Ducent. Sarah took Rikrok's mom, Dorothy Ducent, to the Central London County Court, requesting £900 thousand of the total £1 million, due to Dorothy receiving all of it after Herbert's 2007 death.
