= Mungo Jerry discography =

- Studio albums: 19
- Live albums: 1
- Compilation albums: 16+
- Singles: 58

This article is the discography of British rock band Mungo Jerry.

== Albums ==
=== Studio albums ===
Year	Title	Details	Peak chart positions				
Year	Title	Details	UK	AUS	CAN	GER	US
1970	Mungo Jerry	Released: July 1970; Label: Dawn, Pye, Janus; Formats: LP, MC, 8-track	13	19	59	14	64
1971	Electronically Tested	Released: March 1971; Label: Dawn, Pye; Formats: LP, MC, 8-track; Released in the US by Janus as Memoirs of a Stockbroker with a different track listing	14	—	—	—	—
1971	You Don't Have to Be in the Army	Released: October 1971; Label: Dawn, Pye; Formats: LP, MC, 8-track	—	—	—	—	—
1972	Boot Power	Released: October 1972; Label: Dawn, Pye; Formats: LP, MC, 8-track	—	—	—	—	—
1974	Long Legged Woman	Released: September 1974; Label: Dawn, Pye; Formats: LP, MC, 8-track	—	—	—	—	—
1976	Impala Saga	Released: February 1976; Label: Polydor; Formats: LP, MC	—	—	—	—	—
1977	Lovin' in the Alleys Fightin' in the Streets	Released: May 1977; Label: Polydor; Formats: LP, MC; As Ray Dorset and Mungo Jerry	—	—	—	—	—
1978	Ray Dorset & Mungo Jerry	Released: 1978; Label: Polydor; Formats: LP, MC; As Ray Dorset and Mungo Jerry	—	—	—	—	—
1981	Together Again	Released: 1981; Label: Capriccio, Rossil, Victoria; Formats: LP; Only released in Europe and as Viva England in Spain	—	—	—	—	—
1984	Boogie Up	Released: 1984; Label: Music Team; Formats: LP; As Mungo Jerry and Horizon; Only released in South Africa	—	—	—	—	—
1990	Snakebite	Released: 1990; Label: BBC; Formats: CD	—	—	—	—	—
1997	Old Shoes New Jeans	Released: 1997; Label: KDC; Formats: CD; Only released in Germany	—	—	—	—	—
2001	Candy Dreams	Released: 2001; Label: Deshima Music; Formats: CD; Only released in Germany	—	—	—	—	—
2003	Adults Only	Released: October 2003; Label: Easyplay; Formats: CD; As Mungo Jerry Blues Band	—	—	—	—	—
2007	Naked from the Heart	Released: 2007; Label: Spectre; Formats: CD	—	—	—	—	—
2007	When She Comes She Runs All Over Me	Released: 2007; Label: Easyplay; Formats: CD; As Mungo Jerry Blues Band; Germany-only release	—	—	—	—	—
2011	Cool Jesus	Released: 22 August 2011; Label: 7Us Music; Formats: CD; Only released in Germany	—	—	—	—	—
2015	Kicking Back	Released: 2 June 2015; Label: One Media (digital); Formats: CD, digital download	—	—	—	—	—
2019	Xstreme	Released: 23 August 2019; Label: Raw Sound, One Media (digital); Formats: CD, digital download	—	—	—	—	—
"—" denotes releases that did not chart or were not released in that territory.

=== Live albums ===
Year	Title	Details
2017	100% Live in Baden Baden	Released: 10 February 2017; Label: Raw Sound, One Media (digital); Formats: CD, digital download

=== Compilation albums ===
Year	Title	Details
1973	Mungo Jerry's Greatest Hits	Released: February 1973; Label: Dawn, Pye; Formats: LP, MC, 8-track
1974	Golden Hour Presents Mungo Jerry's Greatest Hits	Released: 1974; Label: Pye Golden Hour; Formats: LP, MC
1977	The Mungo Jerry File	Released: 1977; Label: Pye; Formats: 2xLP
1980	Six a Side	Released: April 1980; Label: Satellite Music; Format: LP
1985	In the Summertime	Released: 1985; Label: PRT Records; Format: LP, MC
1987	Too Fast to Live & Too Young to Die	Released: 5 October 1987; Label: PRT; Format: CD, LP, MC
1990	All the Hits Plus More	Released: 1990; Label: Prestige; Format: CD, LP
1991	In the Summertime: The Best of Mungo Jerry	Released: 1991; Label: Pliz; Format: CD, MC
1997	The Very Best of Mungo Jerry	Released: 1997; Label: Summit; Format: CD
1999	Baby Jump: The Dawn Anthology	Released: September 1999; Label: Dawn; Formats: 2xCD
2003	Best of the Polydor Years	Released: 17 November 2003; Label: 7T's; Formats: CD
2007	In the Summertime: The Best of Mungo Jerry	Released: February 2007; Label: Union Square Music; Formats: CD
2012	The Dawn Singles Collection	Released: 13 August 2012; Label: 7T's; Formats: 2xCD
2016	Rewind	Released: 3 June 2016; Label: Hypertension; Formats: 2xCD; Includes new studio recordings later released on Touch the Sky in 2019
2017	The Dawn Albums Collection	Released: 29 September 2017; Label: 7T's; Formats: 5xCD box set
2018	The Albums 1976–81	Released: 29 June 2018; Label: 7T's; Formats: 5xCD box set
2019	Gold	Released: 23 August 2019; Label: Crimson; Formats: 3xCD, LP
2020	A & B Sides and E.P. Tracks 1970–75	Released: 11 December 2020; Label: BGO; Formats: 2xCD

== Singles ==
Year	Single	Peak chart positions											Album
Year	Single	UK	AUS	BEL (FL)	BEL (WA)	CAN	GER	IRE	NL	NZ	SA	US	Album
1970	"In the Summertime"	1	1	1	1	1	1	1	1	1	1	3	Electronically Tested
1970	"Maggie" (Note: Only released in various countries in Europe and in Australia.)	—	82	10	7	—	—	—	12	—	—	—	Mungo Jerry
1970	"Johnny B. Badde" (Note: Only released in the US, Canada and New Zealand.)	—	—	—	—	80	—	—	—	16	—	—	Mungo Jerry
1970	"Mungo's Blues (Dust Pneumonia Blues)" (Note: Only released in Germany, France and Austria.)	—	—	—	45	—	45	—	—	—	—	—	Non-album single
1971	"Baby Jump"	1	67	—	39	—	11	5	—	12	18	—	Electronically Tested
1971	"Lady Rose"	5	14	20	36	—	7	6	—	4	6	—	Non-album single (Note: A different version was included on Boot Power.)
1971	"Somebody Stole My Wife" (Note: Only released in France and the Netherlands.)	—	—	—	—	—	—	—	29	—	—	—	Electronically Tested
1971	"Santo Antonio, Santo Francisco" (Note: Only released in Italy and Israel.)	—	—	—	—	—	—	—	—	—	—	—	Non-album single
1971	"You Don't Have to Be in the Army to Fight in the War"	13	97	—	—	—	39	—	—	—	—	—	You Don't Have to Be in the Army
1972	"On a Sunday" (Note: Only released in France.)	—	—	—	—	—	—	—	—	—	—	—	You Don't Have to Be in the Army
1972	"Open Up"	21	—	—	—	—	28	15	—	—	—	—	Boot Power
1972	"My Girl and Me" (Note: Released as an EP in the UK, but as a single in Germany, Denmark and Spain.)	—	—	—	—	—	—	—	—	—	—	—	Boot Power
1973	"Alright, Alright, Alright"	3	26	12	16	94	12	4	2	—	—	—	Long Legged Woman
1973	"Wild Love"	32	42	—	—	—	25	—	—	—	—	—	Long Legged Woman
1974	"Long Legged Woman Dressed in Black"	13	84	25	46	—	—	—	—	—	4	—	Long Legged Woman
1974	"All Dressed Up and No Place to Go" (Note: Released as an EP in the UK, but as a single in Germany.)	—	—	—	—	—	—	—	—	—	—	—	Non-album singles
1975	"Can't Get Over Loving You"	—	—	—	—	—	—	—	—	—	—	—	Non-album singles
1975	"Hello Nadine"	—	—	—	25	80	—	—	—	—	—	—	Impala Saga
1976	"It's a Secret" (Note: Only released in various countries in Europe and in South Africa.)	—	—	—	48	—	—	—	—	—	18	—	Impala Saga
1976	"Don't Let Go"	—	—	—	—	—	—	—	—	—	—	—	Non-album singles
1976	"Lana" (Note: Only released in France and Belgium.)	—	—	—	—	—	—	—	—	—	—	—	Non-album singles
1977	"Heavy Foot Stomp" (as Ray Dorset & Mungo Jerry)	—	—	—	—	—	—	—	—	—	—	—	Lovin' in the Alleys Fightin' in the Streets
1977	"All That a Woman Should Be" (Note: Released as an EP in the UK, but as a single in Germany.)	—	—	—	—	—	—	—	—	—	—	—	Lovin' in the Alleys Fightin' in the Streets
1977	"Sur le Pont d'Avignon" (Note: Only released in France, Belgium and Canada.)	—	—	—	—	—	—	—	—	—	—	—	Non-album single
1977	"We're OK"	—	—	—	—	—	—	—	—	—	—	—	Ray Dorset & Mungo Jerry
1978	"Hello It's You Again" (as Ray Dorset & Mungo Jerry) (Note: Only released in Germany.)	—	—	—	—	—	—	—	—	—	—	—	Ray Dorset & Mungo Jerry
1978	"Sugar Mama" (as Ray Dorset & Mungo Jerry)	—	—	—	—	—	—	—	—	—	—	—	Ray Dorset & Mungo Jerry
1979	"Dancin' in the Street" (as Ray Dorset & Mungo Jerry)	—	—	—	—	—	—	—	—	—	—	—	Non-album single
1980	"What's Her Name, What's Her Number?"	—	—	—	—	—	—	—	—	—	—	—	Six A Side
1980	"Let's Get Started" (Note: Only released in South Africa.)	—	—	—	—	—	—	—	—	—	—	—	Non-album single
1981	"Rockin' on the Road" (as Ray Dorset & Mungo Jerry) (Note: Only released in the Netherlands.)	—	—	—	—	—	—	—	—	—	—	—	Together Again
1981	"Knocking on Heaven's Door" (as Ray Dorset with Mungo Jerry)	—	—	—	—	—	—	—	—	—	—	—	Together Again
1983	"Gone, Gone, Gone" (Note: Only released in Germany and Austria.)	—	—	—	—	—	—	—	—	—	—	—	Non-album singles
1983	"There Goes My Heart Again" (as Mungo Jerry featuring Ray Dorset and the Tarts)	—	—	—	—	—	—	—	—	—	—	—	Non-album singles
1984	"Play for You My Drum"	—	—	—	—	—	—	—	—	—	—	—	Non-album singles
1986	"Prospects" (as Made in England featuring Ray Dorset)	87	—	—	—	—	—	—	—	—	—	—	Non-album singles
1986	"Step by Step"	—	—	—	—	—	—	—	—	—	—	—	Non-album singles
1987	"In the Summertime" (as Mungo Jerry & the Brothers Grimm)	—	—	—	—	—	—	—	—	—	—	—	Non-album singles
1988	"Red Leather and Chrome" (Note: Only released in Scandinavia.)	—	—	—	—	—	—	—	—	—	—	—	Non-album singles
1989	"Dancing in the Summertime" (with A La Carte) (Note: Only released in Europe.)	—	—	—	—	—	—	—	—	—	—	—	Sun Sun Summertime by A La Carte
1992	"All I Wanna Do"	—	—	—	—	—	—	—	—	—	—	—	Snakebite
1996	"In the Summertime" (as Star Feature with Mungo Jerry)	—	—	—	—	—	—	—	—	—	—	—	Non-album singles
1997	"In the Snow"	—	—	—	—	—	—	—	—	—	—	—	Non-album singles
1998	"Partyland"	—	—	—	—	—	—	—	—	—	—	—	Non-album singles
1999	"Support the Toon – It's Your Duty" (with the Toon Travellers)	57	—	—	—	—	—	—	—	—	—	—	Non-album singles
2002	"(Do You Wanna) Live with Me"	—	—	—	—	—	—	—	—	—	—	—	Non-album singles
2003	"Lady Rose – 21st Century"	—	—	—	—	—	—	—	—	—	—	—	Non-album singles
2005	"Staying at Home"	—	—	—	—	—	—	—	—	—	—	—	Naked from the Heart
2006	"In the Wintertime" (with Jumpy) (Note: Only released in Denmark.)	—	—	—	—	—	—	—	—	—	—	—	Non-album singles
2007	"Mr. Midnight"	—	—	—	—	—	—	—	—	—	—	—	Non-album singles
2012	"Fairytale of New York" (with Anita Harris)	—	—	—	—	—	—	—	—	—	—	—	Non-album singles
2015	"Feels Like I'm in Love"	—	—	—	—	—	—	—	—	—	—	—	Non-album singles
2015	"Happy Happy Birthday in the Summertime"	—	—	—	—	—	—	—	—	—	—	—	Non-album singles
2019	"Messing Around"	—	—	—	—	—	—	—	—	—	—	—	XStreme
2019	"White Dress"	—	—	—	—	—	—	—	—	—	—	—	XStreme
2020	"Can't Help Falling in Love"	—	—	—	—	—	—	—	—	—	—	—	Non-album singles
2020	"The Lockdown Thank You Song"	—	—	—	—	—	—	—	—	—	—	—	Non-album singles
2021	"That's the Colour of Love"	—	—	—	—	—	—	—	—	—	—	—	Non-album singles
"—" denotes releases that did not chart or were not released in that territory.
