= Mr. Lover Lover: The Best of Shaggy...Part 1 =

Greatest hits album by Shaggy
- Released: January 29, 2002
- Recorded: 1993–2000
- Genre: Reggae fusion, dancehall, reggae
- Length: 51:03
- Label: Virgin
- Producer: O. Burell

Shaggy chronology
Hot Shot: Ultramix (2002)	Mr. Lover Lover: The Best of Shaggy...Part 1 (2002)	Boombastic Hits (2003)

Alternative cover
- American cover

Professional ratings
Review scores
Source	Rating
NME	2/10
Robert Christgau	(2-star Honorable Mention)

Mr. Lover Lover: The Best of Shaggy...Part 1 is the first compilation album released by the Jamaican singer Shaggy. The album includes material from Shaggy's first five studio albums, as well as the new recording, "Get Up, Stand Up".

== Background ==
Origins for the album date back to March 1999, as some sites report that an album, titled the Ultimate Shaggy Collection, was released on March 23, 1999. The album included material from Shaggy's first four studio albums, as well as the original version of "Luv Me, Luv Me", which featured Janet Jackson, and three new songs—"The Reggae Virus", featuring Mad Lion and KRS One, "True Dat" and "Hot Gal". However, no copies of the album ever appear to have been released.

In January 2002, Mr. Lover Lover, a similar compilation, was announced for release in both Europe and the United States. However, despite carrying artwork stating the title Mr. Lover Lover, some American sites listed the compilation under the title Ultimate Shaggy Collection. According to Amazon.com, the American version of Mr. Lover Lover was once again intended to include material from Shaggy's first four albums, the original version of "Luv Me, Luv Me", and three new tracks—"The Reggae Virus", "Better Not Be" and "Hot Gal". The European version did not include these three new tracks. However, when the album was released on January 29, 2002, both the European and American versions of the album had an identical track listing, neither containing the three brand new tracks.

Since the release of Mr. Lover Lover, all listings of the original Ultimate Shaggy Collection released in 1999 have included the artwork from the American version of Mr. Lover Lover. As far as can be seen, only one issue of the album was ever released—with the track listing below—and neither the Ultimate Shaggy Collection nor the American special issue of Mr. Lover Lover were ever released. The album entered the top 10 on the UK Albums Chart. On March 24, 2003, Mr. Lover Lover was reissued under the title The Essential Shaggy. The track listing did not differ.

== Track listing ==
1. "Boombastic" (Sting Remix; from Boombastic)
2. "In the Summertime" (featuring Rayvon; from Boombastic)
3. "Oh Carolina" (from Pure Pleasure)
4. "Luv Me, Luv Me" (featuring Janet Jackson; from How Stella Got Her Groove Back)
5. "Nice and Lovely" (from Pure Pleasure)
6. "The Train Is Coming" (featuring Ken Boothe; from Boombastic)
7. "Why You Treat Me So Bad" (featuring Grand Puba; from Boombastic)
8. "Big Up" (featuring Rayvon; from Pure Pleasure)
9. "Piece of My Heart" (featuring Marsha; from Midnite Lover)
10. "Sexy Body Girls" (from Midnite Lover)
11. "Something Different" (featuring Wayne Wonder; from Boombastic)
12. "That Girl" (featuring Maxi Priest and Rayvon; from Man with the Fun)
13. "Get Up, Stand Up"
14. "Boombastic" (from Boombastic)

=== Unreleased versions ===
- Ultimate Shaggy Collection (1999)
1. "True Dat"
2. "Luv Me, Luv Me" (featuring Janet Jackson)
3. "The Reggae Virus"
4. "That Girl" (featuring Maxi Priest)
5. "In the Summertime" (featuring Rayvon)
6. "Boombastic" (Sting Remix)
7. "Oh Carolina"
8. "Big Up" (featuring Rayvon)
9. "Nice and Lovely" (featuring Rayvon)
10. "Why You Treat Me So Bad?" (featuring Grand Puba)
11. "Hot Gal"
12. "Piece of My Heart" (featuring Marsha)
13. "The Train Is Coming" (featuring Ken Boothe)
14. "Something Different" (featuring Wayne Wonder; Hip Hop Remix)
15. "Perfect Song" (featuring Maxi Priest)
16. "Think Ah So It Go"
- Mr. Lover Lover – American issue (2002)
1. "Boombastic" (Sting Remix)
2. "In the Summertime" (featuring Rayvon)
3. "Oh Carolina"
4. "Nice and Lovely"
5. "The Train Is Coming" (featuring Ken Boothe)
6. "Why You Treat Me So Bad" (featuring Grand Puba)
7. "Big Up" (featuring Rayvon)
8. "Piece of My Heart" (featuring Marsha)
9. "Luv Me, Luv Me" (featuring Janet Jackson)
10. "The Reggae Virus"
11. "Sexy Body Girls"
12. "Something Different" (featuring Wayne Wonder)
13. "That Girl" (featuring Maxi Priest and Rayvon)
14. "Better Not Be"
15. "Hot Gal"
16. "Boombastic"
17. "Get Up, Stand Up"

== Charts ==
=== Weekly charts ===
Weekly chart performance for Mr. Lover Lover: The Best of Shaggy...Part 1
Chart (2002)	Peak position
Austrian Albums (Ö3 Austria)	72
New Zealand Albums (RMNZ)	38
UK Albums (OCC)	20

=== Year-end charts ===
Year-end chart performance for Mr. Lover Lover: The Best of Shaggy...Part 1
Chart (2002)	Position
Canadian R&B Albums (Nielsen SoundScan)	78
Canadian Rap Albums (Nielsen SoundScan)	39

== Certifications ==
Certifications for Mr. Lover Lover: The Best of Shaggy...Part 1
Region	Certification	Certified units/sales
United Kingdom (BPI)	Silver	60,000^{^}
^{^} Shipments figures based on certification alone.
