= Boombastic =

Boombastic may refer to:

- Boombastic (album), a 1995 album by Shaggy
  - "Boombastic" (song), a song by Shaggy from the album
- Boombastic Hits, a 2003 compilation album by Shaggy
- Boombastic, a 1990 album by Little John

== See also ==
- Bombastic (disambiguation)
