= Boombastic Hits =

Greatest hits album by Shaggy
- Released: November 6, 2003
- Recorded: 1993–2003
- Genre: Reggae fusion, dancehall, reggae
- Length: 43:35
- Label: EMI

Shaggy chronology
Mr. Lover Lover (2002)	Boombastic Hits (2003)	The Essential Shaggy (2004)

Boombastic Hits is the second compilation album released by Jamaican singer Shaggy. The album was released on November 6, 2003. The album features a range of material from Shaggy's albums "Boombastic" and "Midnite Lover", as well as the b-side "One Burner", which had previously never been included on any of Shaggy's albums.

== Track listing ==
1. "Boombastic" - 4:09 (From 'Boombastic')
2. "Piece of My Heart" (featuring Marsha) - 4:18 (From 'Midnite Lover')
3. "Something Different" (featuring Wayne Wonder) - 4:31 (From 'Boombastic')
4. "Perfect Song" (featuring Maxi Priest) - 3:43 (From 'Midnite Lover')
5. "One Burner" - 3:52 (B-Side to 'Piece of My Heart')
6. "Heartbreak Suzie" (featuring Gold Mine) - 4:09 (From 'Boombastic')
7. "My Dream" - 3:23 (From 'Midnite Lover')
8. "Geenie" (featuring Brian and Tony Gold) - 4:00 (From 'Midnite Lover')
9. "Forgive Them Father" - 3:28 (From 'Boombastic')
10. "Midnite Lover" - 3:44 (From 'Midnite Lover')
11. "Gal You a Pepper" - 4:18 (From 'Boombastic')
12. "In the Summertime" (Sting vs. Shaggy Remix) - 3:47 (From 'Boombastic')
