= Open Up (Mungo Jerry song) =

Single by Mungo Jerry

from the album Boot Power
- B-side: "Going Back Home", "I Don't Wanna Go Back to School", "No Girl Reaction"
- Released: 1972
- Length: 3:24
- Label: Dawn Records (UK) DNX 2514
- Songwriter: Ray Dorset
- Producer: Barry Murray

Mungo Jerry singles chronology
"You Don't Have to Be in the Army to Fight in the War" (1971)	"Open Up" (1972)	"My Girl and Me" (1972)

"Open Up" is a song and hit single by the British group Mungo Jerry, first released in 1972.

== Chart performance ==
Written by the group's lead vocalist Ray Dorset and produced by Barry Murray, it was the band's fifth single. The song made 21 in the UK Singles Chart in April 1972 staying in the charts for eight weeks.

Like the group's debut single, "In the Summertime," and following singles, it was a maxi-single playing at 33 rpm. Other tracks on the extended play single were "Going Back Home", "I Don't Wanna Go Back to School" and "No Girl Reaction."
