= Open Up =

Open Up or OpenUp may refer to:

== Songs ==
- "Open Up" (Cog song), 2003
- "Open Up" (Leftfield song), 1993
- "Open Up" (Mungo Jerry song), 1972
- "Open Up (That's Enough)", by The Dead Weather from Dodge and Burn
- "Open Up", by Chic from their album Real People
- "Open Up", by DD Smash from their album The Optimist
- "Open Up", by Dispatch from their album Who Are We Living For?
- "Open Up", by Korn from their album See You on the Other Side
- "Open Up", by Lamb from their album Between Darkness and Wonder
- "Open Up", by The Saturdays from their album Wordshaker
- "Open Up", by Chinese singer Shunza, 1999
- "Open Up", by Daniel Caesar from his album Case Study 01

== Other uses ==
- Open Up, the slogan for Eurovision Song Contest 2021
- OpenUP, an implementation of IBM's rational unified process software development framework
- TSO OpenUp, an open data competition run by The Stationery Office in the UK
