= Forgive Them Father =

Forgive Them Father may refer to:

- Luke 23:34 (First saying of Jesus on the cross)
- "Forgive Them Father", a 1995 song by Shaggy from Boombastic
- "Forgive Them Father", a 1998 song by Lauryn Hill from The Miseducation of Lauryn Hill
