= List of Dutch Top 40 number-one singles of 1970 =

These hits topped the Dutch Top 40 in 1970.

Issue Date	Song	Artist(s)	Reference
3 January	"Marian"	The Cats	
10 January	"Marian"	The Cats	
17 January	"Marian"	The Cats	
24 January	"Mighty Joe"	Shocking Blue	
31 January	"Mighty Joe"	Shocking Blue	
7 February	"Mijn gebed"	DC Lewis	
14 February	"Mijn gebed"	DC Lewis	
21 February	"Mijn gebed"	DC Lewis	
28 February	"Mijn gebed"	DC Lewis	
7 March	"Who'll Stop the Rain"	Creedence Clearwater Revival	
14 March	"Who'll Stop the Rain"	Creedence Clearwater Revival	
21 March	"Let It Be"	The Beatles	
28 March	"Lay Down (Candles in the Rain)"	Melanie & The Edwin Hawkins Singers	
4 April	"Lay Down (Candles in the Rain)"	Melanie & The Edwin Hawkins Singers	
11 April	"El Condor Pasa (If I Could)"	Simon & Garfunkel	
18 April	"El Condor Pasa (If I Could)"	Simon & Garfunkel	
25 April	"El Condor Pasa (If I Could)"	Simon & Garfunkel	
2 May	"El Condor Pasa (If I Could)"	Simon & Garfunkel	
9 May	"El Condor Pasa (If I Could)"	Simon & Garfunkel	
16 May	"El Condor Pasa (If I Could)"	Simon & Garfunkel	
23 May	"El Condor Pasa (If I Could)"	Simon & Garfunkel	
30 May	"Up Around the Bend"	Creedence Clearwater Revival	
6 June	"Up Around the Bend"	Creedence Clearwater Revival	
13 June	"Question"	The Moody Blues	
20 June	"Question"	The Moody Blues	
27 June	"Never Marry a Railroad Man"	Shocking Blue	
4 July	"Never Marry a Railroad Man"	Shocking Blue	
11 July	"In the Summertime"	Mungo Jerry	
18 July	"In the Summertime"	Mungo Jerry	
25 July	"In the Summertime"	Mungo Jerry	
1 August	"In the Summertime"	Mungo Jerry	
8 August	"In the Summertime"	Mungo Jerry	
15 August	"In the Summertime"	Mungo Jerry	
22 August	"Back Home"	Golden Earring	
29 August	"Back Home"	Golden Earring	
5 September	"Back Home"	Golden Earring	
12 September	"Back Home"	Golden Earring	
19 September	"Back Home"	Golden Earring	
26 September	"Lola"	The Kinks	
3 October	"Lola"	The Kinks	
10 October	"Lola"	The Kinks	
17 October	"To My Father's House"	Les Humphries Singers	
24 October	"To My Father's House"	Les Humphries Singers	
31 October	"To My Father's House"	Les Humphries Singers	
7 November	"To My Father's House"	Les Humphries Singers	
14 November	"To My Father's House"	Les Humphries Singers	
21 November	"To My Father's House"	Les Humphries Singers	
28 November	"Where Have I Been Wrong"	The Cats	
5 December	"Where Have I Been Wrong"	The Cats	
12 December	"She Likes Weeds"	Tee-Set	
19 December	"She Likes Weeds"	Tee-Set	
26 December	No Top 40 released		

== See also ==
- 1970 in music
