= Mungo Jerry (album) =

Studio album by Mungo Jerry
- Released: December 1969 (UK); July 1970 (US)
- Recorded: 1969
- Genre: Folk blues
- Length: 41:15
- Label: Janus Records
- Producer: Barry Murray

Mungo Jerry chronology
Mungo Jerry (1969)	Electronically Tested (1971)

Professional ratings
Review scores
Source	Rating
Allmusic	3/5 stars
Christgau's Record Guide	B

Mungo Jerry is the debut album by Mungo Jerry, released in 1970. The initial British release featured lettering on the front of the sleeve and a group photo inside which appeared to be three-dimensional when viewed through a pair of 3D red and green lenses included in the packaging. It reached No. 14 in the British charts that summer. Some foreign versions include the track "In the Summertime".

== Track listing ==
Side 1

1. "Baby Let's Play House" (Arthur Gunter) – 2:32
2. "Johnny B. Badde" (Dorset) – 3:00
3. "San Francisco Bay Blues" (Jesse Fuller) – 3:38
4. "Sad Eye Joe" (King) – 2:50
5. "Maggie" (Dorset) – 4:10
6. "Peace in the Country" (Dorset) – 3:05

Side 2

1. "See Me" (Dorset) – 3:37
2. "Movin' On" (King) – 4:14
3. "My Friend" (Dorset) - 2:36
4. "Mother *!*!*! Boogie" (Earl, Cole, King, Dorset) - 2:48
5. "Tramp" (King) - 5:05
6. "Daddies Brew" (Earl) – 3:40

Bonus Tracks
No.	Title	Writer(s)	Length
13.	"Mighty Man" (Non-album single, 1970)	Ray Dorset	4:53
14.	"Dust Pneumonia Blues" (Non-album single, 1970)	Arthur Gunter	5:51
15.	"Santo Antonio Santo Francisco" (Italy-only single, 1971)	Conte/Pallavicini	2:57
16.	"Live From Hollywood: Maggie/Midnight Special/Mighty Man" (Non-album single, 1970)	Ray Dorset	9:44

== Personnel ==
=== Band ===
- Ray Dorset – lead vocals, electric and 6 and 12-string acoustic guitars, kazoo, stomp, tambourine
- Paul King – vocals, 6 and 12-string acoustic guitars, banjo, jug
- Colin Earl – piano
- Mike Cole – bass

=== Technical ===
- Bob Scerbo – production coordinator
- Dorothy Schwartz – coordinator
- The Graffiteria – album design

== Charts ==
Chart (1970–71)	Peak position
Australian Albums (Kent Music Report)	19
Canada Top Albums/CDs (RPM)	59
German Albums (Offizielle Top 100)	14
UK Albums (Official Charts)	13
US Billboard 200	64
