= Long Legged Woman Dressed in Black =

Single by Mungo Jerry

from the album Long Legged Woman
- B-side: "Gonna Bop 'Til I Drop"
- Released: 1974
- Length: 2:55
- Label: Dawn Records (UK)
- Songwriter: Ray Dorset
- Producers: Barry Murray, Ray Dorset

Mungo Jerry singles chronology
"Wild Love" (1973)	"Long Legged Woman Dressed in Black" (1974)	"All Dressed Up and No Place to Go" (1974)

"Long Legged Woman Dressed in Black" is a popular song and hit single by the British group Mungo Jerry, first released in 1974. It also became the title track of a compilation album by the group, released later in 1974.

== Chart performance ==
It was written by the band's lead singer Ray Dorset and produced by Barry Murray and Dorset. In addition to Dorset (guitar, vocals), the line-up of the group at this time which played on the record comprised Dick Middleton (guitar), Bob Daisley (bass), Ian Milne (keyboards), and Dave Bidwell (drums). The song entered the UK Singles Chart in April 1974 and reached No. 13 staying for nine weeks on the chart, their last single to reach the British Top 20. The song peaked at number 84 in Australia.
