= Cold Blue Excursion =

Studio album by Ray Dorset
- Released: January 28 1972
- Recorded: 1971
- Genre: Rock
- Length: 41:29
- Label: Dawn
- Producer: Barry Murray, Ray Dorset

Cold Blue Excursion was a solo album recorded by Ray Dorset, leader of Mungo Jerry. The majority of the group's songs at the time were good-time blues, skiffle and rock’n’roll, and these songs on the solo album, written by him during the previous seven years, were designed to show his versatility as a songwriter away from the confines of the basic Mungo sound. The two photos of Dorset inside the gatefold sleeve — one of him sitting in a woodland clearing playing an acoustic guitar, the other of him onstage delivering an impassioned vocal performance with an electric guitar around his neck — summed the album up as well as the quotes from Woody Guthrie printed inside along the track list —"A song was just a song to me...In my own mind, a song is just a song..."

All the songs were far removed from the group's style. Three other fellow members (John Godfrey, Colin Earl, Joe Rush) only appeared on one track, and the songs varied from gospel and soul to introspective ballads, mostly with full strings and brass accompaniments, and in one case a trad jazz band. Harmonica and kazoo, which Dorset used on most Mungo tracks, were noticeably absent.

The title track, backed with I Need It, was issued as a single, and Time Is Now had been covered as a single by contemporary group Jericho Jones on the A&M label the previous year. Although neither of these singles or the album ever made the UK charts, the latter received positive reviews from several music journalists who had never found Mungo Jerry to their personal taste.

It was reissued by Beat Goes On in 1994.

== Track listing ==
All tracks composed by Ray Dorset

1. "Got To Be Free" – 2:50
2. "Cold Blue Excursion" – 4:09
3. "With Me" – 3:15
4. "Have Pity On Me" – 2:57
5. "Time Is Now" – 3:30
6. "Livin’ Ain’t Easy " – 3:30
7. "Help Your Friends" – 4:11
8. "I Need It" – 3:23
9. "Because I Want You" – 4:17
10. "Night Time" – 3:30
11. "Maybe That’s The Way" – 3:04
12. "Always On My Mind' – 2:53

== Personnel ==
- Ray Dorset - vocals, 6-string acoustic, 12-string acoustic and electric guitars, arrangements
- Mike McNaught - piano, arrangements
- Dave Markee - bass
- Sue and Sunny - backing vocals
- Mike Travis - drums
- Joe Rush - washboard on "Have Pity On Me"
- John Godfrey - bass on "Have Pity On Me"
- Colin Earl - backing vocals on "Have Pity On Me"
- Various uncredited musicians - brass, strings, flutes
- Terry Evennett - engineer
