= Bombastic =

Bombastic may refer to:

- Bombastic (EP), a 2015 EP by Bonnie McKee
- Bombastic (video game), a video game for PlayStation 2

== See also ==
- Boombastic (disambiguation)
- Bombast
- Verbosity
