= Lady Rose (song) =

Single by Mungo Jerry
- B-side: "Little Louis, Have a Whiff On Me, Milk Cow Blues"
- Released: 1971
- Genre: Pop, rock
- Length: 3:10
- Label: Dawn Records (UK)
- Songwriter: Ray Dorset
- Producer: Barry Murray

Mungo Jerry singles chronology
"Baby Jump" (1971)	"Lady Rose" (1971)	"You Don't Have to Be in the Army to Fight in the War" (1971)

"Lady Rose" is a song by British group Mungo Jerry, released as a single in 1971.

Written by the group's lead vocalist Ray Dorset and produced by Barry Murray, it was the band's third single. The song entered the UK charts at #30 in May 1971 and reached #5 in June, finally leaving the chart in August 1971. It also reached number 14 in Australia, number four in New Zealand.

Like the group's debut single, "In the Summertime," and follow-up "Baby Jump", it was a maxi-single playing at 33 rpm. The main song features harmonica and piano. The other tracks on the extended play single are Little Louis by band member, Paul King, a cover of Lead Belly's Have a Whiff on Me, and a cover of Elvis Presley's Milk Cow Blues. The BBC initially banned it from radio play because of the inclusion of "Have a Whiff on Me", which was thought to condone drug-taking, and distribution and sales were halted while it was reissued with "She Rowed", from the group's second LP as the second track instead. Ironically, the group had decided to include the offending song because it had been well received when they originally recorded it for broadcast as part of a session for Radio 1.
