= Electronically Tested =

Studio album by Mungo Jerry
- Released: March 1971
- Recorded: 1970–71
- Genre: Blues rock, skiffle
- Length: 38:56
- Label: Dawn
- Producer: Barry Murray

Mungo Jerry chronology
Mungo Jerry (1970)	Electronically Tested (1971)	You Don’t Have to Be in the Army (1971)

Singles from Electronically Tested
- 1. "In the Summertime" Released: June 17, 1970

Professional ratings
Review scores
Source	Rating
Allmusic	4.5/5 stars

Electronically Tested is the second album by the British rock band Mungo Jerry, released in March 1971.

== Release ==
The UK version was issued on Dawn Records, and it appeared with slightly different track listings in other countries, as many territories outside the UK had already added the group's debut single and first hit, "In the Summertime", to the running order on the first album of the band: the eponymous Mungo Jerry. All songs were written by the group's frontman Ray Dorset, apart from an extended version of the Willie Dixon blues standard "I Just Want to Make Love to You". In some other states, pressings included the Paul King song, "Black Bubonic Plague", and the album was also retitled as Memoirs of a Stockbroker, because the UK title, taken from an advertisement for contraceptives, was deemed too risqué. In more other countries the release was also called Baby Jump (Electronically Tested), with an alternate track sequence.

It peaked in the UK album charts at No. 13.

Recent reissues on CD have included bonus tracks featuring songs from the maxi-singles that did not appear on album at the time.

Ray "Bizz" Bissiker, who guested on recorder, was also the group's roadie.

The titles comes from a guarantee on a packet of Durex condoms.

== Track listing ==
All songs written by Ray Dorset, except where noted.

1. "She Rowed" – 3:15
2. "I Just Wanna Make Love to You" (Willie Dixon) – 9:01
3. "In the Summertime" – 3:30
4. "Somebody Stole My Wife" – 2:53
5. "Baby Jump" – 4:09
6. "Follow Me Down" – 3:17
7. "Memoirs of a Stockbroker" – 4:00
8. "You Better Leave That Whisky Alone" – 3:55
9. "Coming Back to You When the Time Comes" – 3:38

Bonus Tracks
No.	Title	Writer(s)	Length
10.	"The Man Behind the Piano" (non-LP single)	Paul King	3:27
11.	"Lady Rose" (non-LP single)	Ray Dorset	3:13
12.	"Have a Whiff on Me [UK ver]" (non-LP single)	Trad,. arr by Ray Dorset	3:59
13.	"Little Louis" (non-LP single)	Paul King	3:53
14.	"Black Bubonic Plague" (bonus track)	Paul King	5:36
15.	"Have a Whiff on Me [US ver]" (non-LP single)	Trad,. arr by Ray Dorset	3:08

== Personnel ==
- Ray Dorset – lead vocals, electric and 6 and 12-string acoustic guitars, harmonica, kazoo, stomp, tambourine
- Paul King – vocals, 6 and 12-string acoustic guitars, harmonica, banjo guitar, jug, recorder
- Colin Earl – piano
- John Godfrey – bass
- Ray Bissiker – recorder
- Roger Earl – drums on "Memoirs of a Stockbroker"

== Charts ==
Chart (1971)	Peak position
UK Albums (OCC)	14
