= Why You Treat Me So Bad (Shaggy song) =

1995 single by Shaggy

Single by Shaggy featuring Grand Puba

from the album Boombastic
- B-side: "Demand the Ride"; "The Train Is Coming"; "Big Up"
- Released: 1995
- Genre: Hip-hop; ragga
- Length: 3:55
- Label: Virgin
- Songwriters: Orville Burrell; Maxwell Dixon; Robert Livingston; Bob Marley
- Producers: Sting International; Robert Livingston

Shaggy singles chronology
"Boombastic" (1995)	"Why You Treat Me So Bad" (1995)	"Piece of My Heart" (1997)

Grand Puba singles chronology
"A Little of This" (1995)	"Why You Treat Me So Bad" (1995)	"Actual Facts" (1996)

Music video
- "Why You Treat Me So Bad" on YouTube

"Why You Treat Me So Bad" is a song co-written and recorded by Jamaican reggae artist Shaggy featuring American rapper Grand Puba. It was released in 1995 by Virgin Records as the third single from his third studio album, Boombastic (1995), and contains elements from "Mr. Brown" by Bob Marley. The song entered the top 20 in Ireland, New Zealand, and the United Kingdom.

== Critical reception ==
Larry Flick from Billboard magazine commented in his review of the single, "As astute programmers have known for some time, there is way more to Shaggy than his top 10 hit 'Boombastic'. Fun and fresh changes in tempo and the distinctive vocal styles of Shaggy and Grand Puba complement one another. Get up and play it." Another Billboard editor, Paul Verna, remarked that the song benefits from Puba's "off-kilter musings, buzzes madly and bounces like aural Jello". Chuck Campbell from Knoxville News Sentinel viewed it as "nasty fun for those who can get past the misogyny." In his weekly UK chart commentary in Dotmusic, James Masterton said, "It will probably struggle to become as big a hit as his past few efforts, featuring less of the humour that made "Boombastic" such a commercial hit."

Heidi Siegmund Cuda from Los Angeles Times felt that Shaggy "rounds out" his reggae repertoire with "such likable dance-hall treats", as the "lovelorn" "Why You Treat Me So Bad?". A reviewer from Music Week wrote, "Mr Boombastic returns with a mid-tempo hip hop swayer with a jazzy swingtime flavour and a cameo from New York rapper Grand Puba. It's more laid back than his last release and should give Shaggy another hit." James Hamilton from the Record Mirror Dance Update declared it as a "'Why must you treat me so bad?' girls pushed terrific funky ragga rap jolter". Al Weisel of Rolling Stone found that the "funky grind" of the song "demonstrate an equal fluency in contemporary mainland rhythm."

== Track listings ==
- US CD single 1 (1995)
1. "Why You Treat Me So Bad" (radio mix)
2. "Why You Treat Me So Bad" (club mix)
3. "The Train Is Coming" (film version featuring Ken Boothe)
4. "Demand the Ride"
- US CD single 2 (1995)
1. "Why You Treat Me So Bad" (Salaam clean radio remix) – 4:19
2. "Why You Treat Me So Bad" (Sting radio remix) – 4:04
3. "Demand the Ride" – 4:00
4. "Big Up" (featuring Rayvon) – 3:36
- US cassette single (1995)
1. "Why You Treat Me So Bad" (radio mix) – 3:51
2. "Why You Treat Me So Bad" (club mix) – 3:53
- UK and Australasian CD single (1996)
1. "Why You Treat Me So Bad" (radio mix)
2. "Why You Treat Me So Bad" (Soul Inside mix)
3. "Why You Treat Me So Bad" (club mix)
4. "Why You Treat Me So Bad" (LP version)
- UK cassette single (1996) and European CD single (1995)
1. "Why You Treat Me So Bad" (radio mix)
2. "Why You Treat Me So Bad" (Soul Inside mix)

== Charts ==
Weekly chart performance for "Why You Treat Me So Bad"
Chart (1996)	Peak position
Australia (ARIA)	93
Europe (Eurochart Hot 100)	41
Europe (European Dance Radio)	6
Europe (European Hit Radio)	26
Ireland (IRMA)	17
Italy (Musica e dischi)	21
Netherlands (Dutch Top 40 Tipparade)	8
Netherlands (Single Top 100)	47
New Zealand (Recorded Music NZ)	20
Scotland Singles (OCC)	30
UK Singles (OCC)	11
UK Dance (OCC)	14
UK Hip Hop/R&B (OCC)	4
UK Airplay (Music Week)	31
UK Club Chart (Music Week)	58
US Bubbling Under Hot 100 (Billboard)	8
US Dance Singles Sales (Billboard)	46
US Hot R&B/Hip-Hop Songs (Billboard)	52
US Hot Rap Songs (Billboard)	22

== Release history ==
Release dates and formats "Why You Treat Me So Bad"
Region	Date	Format(s)	Label(s)	Ref.
United States	1995	CD; cassette	Virgin	
United Kingdom	1 January 1996	12-inch vinyl; CD; cassette	Virgin	
United States	12 March 1996	Rhythmic contemporary radio	Virgin	
