= Kelly Marie =

Scottish singer (born 1957)

- Born: Jacqueline McKinnon; 16 October 1957 (age 68)
- Origin: Paisley, Renfrewshire, Scotland
- Genres: Disco; hi-NRG
- Occupation: Singer
- Instrument: Vocals
- Years active: 1969–present
- Website: officialkellymarie.co.uk

Kelly Marie (born Jacqueline McKinnon; 16 October 1957) is a Scottish singer, best known for the song "Feels Like I'm in Love", a No. 1 hit in the UK in 1980.

== Early career ==
Born to Alex and Jeanette McKinnon, Marie began training for a performing career at age ten. She began appearing in singing competitions at age twelve and made her television debut at age fifteen. At age sixteen, as Keli Brown, she appeared on the television talent show Opportunity Knocks winning four times, with her rendition of "I Don't Know How to Love Him". This exposure led to her signing with Pye Records, which released Marie's debut single "Who's that Lady with My Man" in April 1976. That track reached No. 5 in France during the summer and earned a gold disc for sales in excess of 300,000 copies. The follow-up, "Help Me", was also a hit in France, reaching No. 17. Also in 1976, she was credited for her cameo vocal on "Sister Mary" a No. 2 hit in Ireland for Joe Dolan. Her 1977 single, "Run to Me", was a hit in the Netherlands (No. 22) and South Africa (No. 5), while in Canada, the B-side of "Run to Me" titled "Listen to the Children" reached No. 36 on the Canadian A.C. chart on 17 September 1977.

In 1978, "Make Love to Me" gave Marie her most significant success to that point in the English-speaking world, reaching No. 2 in South Africa and No. 5 in Australia; the track spent forty-one weeks in the Australian Top 100 and was ranked as the No. 12 hit of the year.

== "Feels Like I'm in Love" ==
Marie chanced across the song "Feels Like I'm in Love" in a music publishing office. Ray Dorset had written it in 1977 in hopes of having Elvis Presley record it; it is unclear if the song was ever pitched to Presley before his death that year. Dorset's group Mungo Jerry did record the song but their version was relegated to the B-side of a Belgian single "Sur Le Pont D'Avignon" (A-side).

Marie and Peter Yellowstone – who had co-written her hits with Mike Tinsley – saw the potential of the song as a follow-up to "Make Love to Me", and Marie's recording of "Feels Like I'm in Love" returned her to the top 10 in South Africa (No. 7) in November 1979.

Like all of Marie's recordings to that date, "Feels Like I'm in Love" initially failed to become a hit in the UK, but it did become a popular disco tune first in Scotland and eventually all over Britain. The track's prolonged popularity in the clubs led Pye to re-release the song in the summer of 1980, and after a No. 61 debut on the chart dated 2 August, it then entered the top ten on 23 August, and spent the weeks of 13 and 20 September at No. 1. The track also enjoyed international success with chart rankings of No. 6 in Austria, No. 2 in Belgium, No. 6 in Australia, No. 5 in Germany, and No. 3 in the Netherlands and Ireland. In addition, the track reached No. 10 on the U.S. Dance chart in 1981.

== Later career ==
The intense success of "Feels Like I'm in Love" did not result in any significant stardom for its singer. The decline of Marie's mainstream career became clear when her UK releases subsequent to "Feels Like I'm in Love" charted first outside the top 20 ("Loving Just for Fun" No. 21; "Hot Love" No. 22) and then outside the top 50 ("Love Trial" No. 51). Marie continued to record dance tracks, through which she remained a presence on the international club scene. She took a break from recording in 1984, around the time she met her husband and began a family, which would extend to five daughters and one son.

After another absence from recording, Marie cut a new version of "Feels Like I'm in Love" in 1997, and continued recording with dance versions of "Rescue Me", "I'm in the Mood for Dancin'", "Blanket on the Ground", "Runaway", "Millennium", "I Need a Man" and "River Deep - Mountain High" as well as a new version of "Hot Love". Her final recording to date would seem to be a 2002 collaboration with Tina Charles with whom she remade "To Sir with Love" and "Your Disco Needs You".

On 7 May 2005, Marie appeared on the ITV show Hit Me, Baby, One More Time, singing "Feels Like I'm in Love" and "Oops!... I Did It Again" in hopes of progressing to the final to compete for the major label release of a new single. The popular vote went to Chesney Hawkes.

== Discography ==
=== Studio albums ===
- Who's That Lady with My Man? (Pye Records, 1976)
- Make Love to Me (Pye Records, 1978)
- If I Can't Have You (Disques Vogue, 1978)
- Do You Like It Like That? (Calibre Records, 1979)
- Feels Like I'm in Love (PRT Records, 1980)

=== Compilation albums ===
- The Best of Kelly Marie (2002)
- Feels Like I'm in Love – The Ultimate Collection (2007)

=== Singles ===
Year	Single	Peak chart positions											Certifications
Year	Single	UK	FRA	GER	IRL	AUT	US Dance	NLD	SA	AUS	BEL	DEN	Certifications
1976	"Sister Mary" (duet with Joe Dolan)	—	—	—	2	—	—	—	—	—	—	—	
1976	"Who's That Lady with My Man"	—	1	—	—	—	—	—	—	—	—	—	
1976	"Help Me"	—	17	—	—	—	—	—	—	—	—	—	
1976	"Goodbye Venice Goodbye"	—	—	—	—	—	—	—	—	—	—	—	
1977	"All We Need is Love"	—	—	—	—	—	—	—	—	—	—	—	
1977	"Run to Me"	—	—	—	—	—	27	22	5	—	—	—	
1978	"Make Love to Me"	—	—	—	—	—	—	—	2	5	—	—	
1978	"Loving Just for Fun"	—	—	—	—	—	—	—	—	—	—	—	
1978	"Take Me to Paradise"	—	—	—	—	—	—	—	—	—	—	—	
1978	"If I Can't Have You"	—	—	—	—	—	—	—	—	—	—	—	
1979	"Feels Like I'm in Love"	—	—	—	—	—	—	—	—	—	—	—	
1980	"Feels Like I'm in Love" (re-release)	1	—	5	3	6	10	3	7	7	2	—	BPI: Gold
1980	"Loving Just for Fun" (re-release)	21	—	20	22	—	10	—	—	—	—	—	
1981	"Hot Love"	22	—	25	13	—	—	—	—	—	—	—	
1981	"Love Trial"	51	—	75	—	—	—	—	—	—	—	—	
1981	"Don't Stop Your Love"	—	—	—	—	—	—	—	—	—	—	—	
1982	"I Need Your Love"	—	—	—	—	—	—	—	—	—	—	—	
1982	"I Feel Love Comin' On"	—	—	—	—	—	—	—	—	—	—	—	
1982	"Love's Got a Hold on You"	—	—	—	—	—	—	—	—	—	—	—	
1982	"Don't Take Your Love to Hollywood"	—	—	—	—	—	—	—	—	—	—	—	
1983	"Silent Treatment"	—	—	—	—	—	—	—	—	—	—	—	
1984	"Break Out"	90	—	—	—	—	—	—	—	—	—	—	
1984	"I'm on Fire"	—	—	—	—	—	—	—	—	—	—	—	
1985	"Don't Let the Flame Die Out"	—	—	—	—	—	—	—	—	—	—	—	
1985	"Born To Be Alive"	—	—	—	—	—	—	—	—	—	—	—	
1986	"Burning" Sapphire Feat Kelly Marie	—	—	—	—	—	—	—	—	—	—	—	
1986	"Hands Up"	—	—	—	—	—	—	—	—	—	—	—	
1987	"Halfway To Paradise"	—	—	—	—	—	—	—	—	—	—	2	
1988	"Stealing My Time"	—	—	—	—	—	—	—	—	—	—	—	
1991	"Feels Like I'm in Love" (90s PWL remix)	—	—	—	—	—	—	—	—	149	—	—	
1997	"Feels Like I'm In Love 97"	—	—	—	—	—	—	—	—	—	—	—	
1998	"Rescue Me"	—	—	—	—	—	—	—	—	—	—	—	
1998	"I'm In The Mood For Dancin"	—	—	—	—	—	—	—	—	—	—	—	
1998	"Blanket On The Ground"	—	—	—	—	—	—	—	—	—	—	—	
1999	"Runaway/Millennium"	—	—	—	—	—	—	—	—	—	—	—	
1999	"I Need A Man"	—	—	—	—	—	—	—	—	—	—	—	
2000	"River Deep Mountain High"	—	—	—	—	—	—	—	—	—	—	—	
2001	"Hot Love 2001"	—	—	—	—	—	—	—	—	—	—	—	
2002	"To Sir With Love / Your Disco Needs You" Kelly Marie / Tina Charles	—	—	—	—	—	—	—	—	—	—	—	
"—" denotes releases that did not chart or were not released in that territory.

== See also ==
- List of disco artists (F-K)
- List of Scottish musicians
- List of artists who reached number one on the UK Singles Chart
- List of performers on Top of the Pops
