= Feels Like I'm in Love =

1977 song by Mungo Jerry

Single by Mungo Jerry
- A-side: "Sur le Pont d'Avignon"
- Released: 1977
- Length: 3:32
- Label: Polydor
- Songwriter: Ray Dorset
- Producer: Ray Dorset

Mungo Jerry singles chronology
"All That a Woman Should Be" (1977)	"Sur le Pont d'Avignon" / "Feels Like I'm in Love" (1977)	"We're OK" (1977)

"Feels Like I'm in Love" is a song written and recorded by Ray Dorset with his band Mungo Jerry. It was a number-one hit on the UK Singles Chart for two weeks in September 1980 for Scottish singer Kelly Marie.

== Original version ==
Written by Ray Dorset of Mungo Jerry, the song was originally written with Elvis Presley in mind, but he died before it was sent to him. Dorset's group recorded the song but their version was relegated to the B-side of a Belgian single, "Sur le Pont d'Avignon".

== Kelly Marie version ==
"Feels Like I'm in Love"

Single by Kelly Marie

from the album Do You Like It Like That?
- Released: July 1979
- Genre: Disco
- Length: 3:13
- Label: Calibre
- Songwriter: Ray Dorset
- Producer: Pete Yellowstone

Kelly Marie singles chronology
"If I Can't Have You" (1979)	"Feels Like I'm in Love" (1979)	"Lovin' Just for Fun" (1980)

Music video
- "" on YouTube

"Feels Like I'm in Love"

Single by Kelly Marie
- B-side: "My Heart Surrenders"; "Stealing My Time"
- Released: 1990
- Length: 3:40 (radio edit)
- Label: Dance Street, Loading Bay, ZYX
- Songwriter: R. Dorset

Kelly Marie singles chronology
"Stealing My Time" (1988)	"Feels Like I'm in Love" (1990)	"Rescue Me" (1997)

Music video
- "Feels Like I'm in Love" on YouTube

In 1979, Kelly Marie recorded the song for Pye Records. The song was a sleeper hit on the Scottish club scene before breaking through nationally in the summer of 1980, reaching the top of the UK Singles Chart in September. The song sold 760,000 copies in United Kingdom in 1980 alone. The following year, aided by a number of remixes the song became a club hit in the United States, reaching number ten on the Billboard Hot Dance Club Play chart.

Re-released on the Calibre record label with a new B-side "New York at Night", it followed a rare breed of record labels who gained a chart-topping success after their debut release. It was then re-released again in 1990 as a remix that was done by PWL.

=== Composition ===
The song is performed in the key of C major with a tempo of 121 beats per minute.

=== Charts ===
==== Weekly charts ====
Chart (1980–1981)	Peak position
Australia (Kent Music Report)	7
Austria (Ö3 Austria Top 40)	6
Belgium (Ultratop 50 Flanders)	2
Denmark (Hitlisten)	1
Ireland (IRMA)	3
Netherlands (Dutch Top 40)	4
Netherlands (Single Top 100)	3
South Africa (Springbok Radio)	7
Switzerland (Sonntagsblick Hitparade)	11
UK Singles (Official Charts)	1
US Hot Dance Club Play (Billboard)	10
West Germany (GfK)	5

==== Year-end charts ====
Chart (1980)	Position
Australia (Kent Music Report)	85
Belgium (Ultratop 50 Flanders)	14
Netherlands (Dutch Top 40)	38
Netherlands (Single Top 100)	36
UK Singles (OCC)	3

Chart (1981)	Position
Australia (Kent Music Report)	69

== Cover versions ==
- Australian dance group Raffles released a cover version of "Feels Like I'm in Love" in November 1994, which peaked at number 66 on the Australian singles chart in early 1995.
