= Baby Jump =

Single by Mungo Jerry

from the album Electronically Tested
- B-side: "The Man Behind the Piano"/"Live from Hollywood" (Maggie, Midnight Special, Mighty Man)
- Released: 1971
- Genre: Pop, rock and roll
- Length: 4:10
- Label: Dawn Records (UK); Janus Records (US)
- Songwriter: Ray Dorset
- Producer: Barry Murray

Mungo Jerry singles chronology
"In the Summertime" (1970)	"Baby Jump" (1971)	"Lady Rose" (1971)

"Baby Jump" is a popular song, released as a single in 1971 by Mungo Jerry.

Written by the group's lead vocalist and guitarist Ray Dorset and produced by Barry Murray, it was the band's second No. 1 single, reaching the top of the UK Singles Chart for two weeks in March 1971. The song originally entered at No. 32 before dropping out of the chart due to lack of sales data owing to a national postal strike, but re-entered two weeks later at No. 14. The song also reached No. 5 in the Irish Singles Chart.

Like the group's debut single, "In the Summertime", the British release was a maxi-single playing at 33 rpm. The second track on the A-side was a Paul King composition, "The Man Behind the Piano". The B-side, which had a playing time of 9 minutes 50 seconds, included live recordings from their Hollywood Festival appearance of "Maggie" (excerpt), "Midnight Special", and "Mighty Man".
