= Boombastic (song) =

1995 single by Shaggy

Single by Shaggy

from the album Boombastic
- B-side: "In the Summertime" (remix)
- Released: May 1995
- Genre: Reggae fusion; pop
- Length: 4:10 (original version); 3:52 (Sting International remix)
- Label: Virgin
- Songwriters: Orville Burrell; Robert Livingston; King Floyd
- Producers: Sting International; Robert Livingston

Shaggy singles chronology
"In the Summertime" (1995)	"Boombastic" (1995)	"Why You Treat Me So Bad" (1996)

Music video
- "Boombastic" (remix featuring Sting International) on YouTube

"Boombastic" or "Mr. Boombastic" is a song by Jamaican reggae artist Shaggy, released in May 1995 by Virgin Records as the second single from his third studio album, Boombastic (1995). The song was both produced and co-written by Shaggy. After being used in an ad for Levi's, it achieved commercial success in many countries, including Ireland, UK, Sweden, New Zealand, and Australia, where it topped the singles charts. It spent a week at number one on both the US Billboard R&B chart and the UK Singles Chart. It also reached number three on the Billboard Hot 100 and Cash Box Top 100. The track contains a sample from King Floyd song "Baby Let Me Kiss You". A remix featuring Sting International, which features a sample of Marvin Gaye's "Let's Get It On", was released in January 1996. The latter is featured on some versions of the Boombastic album as a bonus track.

== Critical reception ==
"Boombastic" received mainly favorable reviews from music critics. AllMusic editor David Jeffries viewed the song as "pivotal" for the musician. Larry Flick from Billboard magazine noted that it "jerks about with a hypnotic groove that owes as much to hip hop and rave/pop as it does to traditional island music. Shaggy's toasting is quite friendly to mainstream pop ears, and he masterfully twists and bends the chorus. Primed for immediate picking by jeep listeners, smoking track comes in two radical versions that are designed to lure both street kids and their more mature counterparts."

Chuck Campbell from Knoxville News Sentinel declared it as "a confident come-on" driven by the singer's "gravelly purr". He added that it's "making a deeper mark on the American psyche. Unfortunately for Shaggy, the song sounds more like a summer novelty hit than a trendsetting milestone." Heidi Siegmund Cuda from Los Angeles Times felt "Boombastic" "is by far this summer’s most enchanting radio tune." David Hemingway from Melody Maker deemed it "ragga ordinaire".

A reviewer from Music Week gave the track four out of five, stating that being used in the latest Levi's ad, it's "guaranteeing the Shagster another UK smash with this slo-mo pop ragga which samples Marvin Gaye's 'Let's Get It On'." John Kilgo from The Network Forty named it a "reggae/rap masterpiece". Johnny Cigarettes from NME said, "As chat-up lines go this is so simple, it's brilliant, basically saying 'I'm really rather fantastic in bed, pet, would you like to have intercourse?' As a pop record, however, it is spectacularly boring, like Shabba Ranks' little brother doing toasting practice while he's getting the piano tuned up." Gerald Martinez from New Sunday Times found that "with sparse, hypnotic backing, Shaggy's boastful rapping carries the song."

A reviewer from People Magazine opined that the album "is more like the real reggae thing", and "the raw title song is the style's most uncompromising Top 10 trip yet." James Hamilton from the Record Mirror Dance Update described it as "gruffy twiddly-diddled". Al Weisel from Rolling Stone viewed it as "a stripped-down dub masterpiece, a percussive cacophony of samples, sound effects and a clanging piano. Shaggy's baritone growl oozes a sexuality that recalls both the dance-hall swagger of Shabba Ranks and theatrical self-deprecation of ska king Prince Buster."

Mark Sutherland from Smash Hits gave "Boombastic" two out of five, calling it a "gruff, grinding ragga-lite" track. David Sinclair from The Times described it as "an entertaining tribute to the singer's boundless sex appeal", noting Shaggy's "mischievous glee, the Rs rolling off his tongue like the purr of a big cat." He added, "Set to a plonking, one-note piano riff and minimalist reggae beat, 'Boombastic' is one of those feelgood dance records that seems to conjure a special magic out of thin air. Like the hero in the ad, it will be flying out of shops everywhere."

=== Retrospective response ===
Bill Lamb from About.com said Shaggy "exhibits oodles of personal charm alongside the funky grooves" of "Boombastic", naming it one of the best songs from 1990s. Tom Ewing of Freaky Trigger said the musician is "the benevolent monarch of this world, giving a comical, flirtatious, crowd-tickling performance, his army of mechanical instruments dancing in and out of his phrasing. His main trick here is using his voice like a yo-yo, winding his vowels out on "rohhhhhh-" before he flicks the word back "-mantic!"."

== Chart performance ==
"Boombastic" peaked at number one in Australia, El Salvador, Ireland, Italy, New Zealand, Sweden, and the UK, where it topped the UK Singles Chart in September 1995. In Europe, the song entered the top five in Austria, Belgium, Denmark, Finland, Germany, Iceland, the Netherlands, Norway, Spain, and Switzerland. In France, it was a top-10 hit. On the Eurochart Hot 100, "Boombastic" reached number one in November 1995. In the US, the song peaked at number one on the Billboard Hot R&B Singles chart and number three on both the Billboard Hot 100 and Cash Box Top 100. In Canada, it reached number eight on the RPM Dance chart. "Boombastic" earned a gold record in Austria, France and Germany, while receiving a platinum record in Australia, New Zealand, Norway, the UK, and the US.

== Music video ==
The accompanying music video for "Boombastic" features Shaggy performing in and outside an old house, surrounded by dancing women and flickering lights. It was nominated for Best Clip in the category for R&B/Urban at the 1995 Billboard Music Video Awards.

== Track listings ==
=== United Kingdom ===
- CD single
1. "Boombastic" (7-inch Original Edit) – 3:52
2. "Boombastic" (StoneBridge Vocal Remix) – 5:59
- Maxi single
1. "Boombastic" (7-inch Original Edit) – 3:52
2. "Boombastic" (StoneBridge Vocal Remix) – 3:52
3. "Boombastic" (Wag Ya Tail Remix) – 4:19
4. "Boombastic" (Firefox & 4Tree BassBoom Remix) – 6:32
5. "Boombastic" (Sting vs. Shaggy Remix) – 5:59
6. "Boombastic" (Boom the Dancehall Dub) – 6:05
- Cassette
1. "Boombastic" (7-inch Original Edit) – 3:52
2. "Boombastic" (StoneBridge Vocal Remix) – 3:52
3. "Boombastic" (Firefox & 4Tree BassBoom Remix) – 6:32
4. "Boombastic" (Sting vs. Shaggy Remix) – 5:59
- 7-inch vinyl
1. "Boombastic" (7-inch Original Edit) – 3:52
2. "Boombastic" (Sting vs. Shaggy Remix) – 5:59
- 12-inch vinyl
1. "Boombastic" (LP Version) – 4:08
2. "Boombastic" (StoneBridge Vocal Remix) – 3:52
3. "Boombastic" (Wag Ya Tail Remix) – 4:19
4. "Boombastic" (Firefox & 4Tree BassBoom Remix) – 6:32
5. "Boombastic" (Sting vs. Shaggy Remix) – 5:59
6. "Boombastic" (Boom the Dancehall Dub) – 6:05
- 12-inch vinyl – Jungle Mixes
1. "Boombastic" (Firefox & 4Tree BassBoom Remix) – 6:32
2. "Boombastic" (Boom the Dancehall Dub) – 6:05

=== United States ===
- CD single
1. "Boombastic" (LP Version) – 4:08
2. "Boombastic" (Sting vs. Shaggy Remix) – 4:16
3. "Boombastic" (Firefox & 4Tree BassBoom Remix) – 6:32
4. "In the Summertime" – 4:00
5. "Gal Yu a Pepper" – 4:16
- Cassette
1. "Boombastic" (LP Version) – 4:08
2. "Boombastic" (Sting vs. Shaggy Remix) – 4:16
3. "In the Summertime" – 4:00
4. "Gal Yu a Pepper" – 4:16
- 12-inch vinyl
1. "Boombastic" (LP Version) – 4:08
2. "Boombastic" (Sting vs. Shaggy Remix) – 4:16
3. "Boombastic" (Boom the Dancehall Dub) – 6:05
4. "In the Summertime" – 4:00
5. "Gal Yu a Pepper" – 4:16

== Charts ==
=== Weekly charts ===
Chart (1995–1996)	Peak position
Australia (ARIA)	1
Austria (Ö3 Austria Top 40)	2
Belgium (Ultratop 50 Flanders)	4
Belgium (Ultratop 50 Wallonia)	5
Canada Dance/Urban (RPM)	8
Denmark (IFPI)	2
El Salvador (El Siglo de Torreón)	1
Europe (Eurochart Hot 100)	1
Europe (European Dance Radio)	5
Europe (European Hit Radio)	16
Finland (Suomen virallinen lista)	2
France (SNEP)	7
Germany (Media Control)	2
Iceland (Íslenski Listinn Topp 40)	4
Ireland (IRMA)	1
Italy (Musica e dischi)	1
Italy Airplay (Music & Media)	5
Netherlands (Dutch Top 40)	4
Netherlands (Single Top 100)	4
New Zealand (RIANZ)	1
Norway (VG-lista)	2
Scotland (OCC)	2
Spain (AFYVE)	3
Sweden (Topplistan)	1
Switzerland (Schweizer Hitparade)	3
UK Singles (Official Charts)	1
UK Hip Hop/R&B (Official Charts)	1
US Billboard Hot 100 with "In the Summertime"	3
US Dance Singles Sales (Billboard) with "In the Summertime"	2
US Hot R&B/Hip-Hop Songs (Billboard) with "In the Summertime"	1
US Hot Rap Songs (Billboard) with "In the Summertime"	1
US Rhythmic Airplay (Billboard)	6
US Cash Box Top 100	3

=== Year-end charts ===
Chart (1995)	Position
Austria (Ö3 Austria Top 40)	28
Belgium (Ultratop 50 Flanders)	30
Belgium (Ultratop 50 Wallonia)	39
Brazil (Crowley)	44
Europe (Eurochart Hot 100)	3
Europe (European Dance Radio)	14
France (SNEP)	45
Germany (Media Control)	26
Iceland (Íslenski Listinn Topp 40)	92
Netherlands (Dutch Top 40)	42
Netherlands (Single Top 100)	28
New Zealand (RIANZ)	3
Sweden (Topplistan)	4
Switzerland (Schweizer Hitparade)	34
UK Singles (OCC)	15
US Billboard Hot 100	18
US Hot R&B Singles (Billboard)	9
US Hot Rap Singles (Billboard)	7
US Maxi-Singles Sales (Billboard)	8
US Cash Box Top 100	23

Chart (1996)	Position
Australia (ARIA)	16
Europe (Eurochart Hot 100)	75

== Certifications ==
Region	Certification	Certified units/sales
Australia (ARIA)	Platinum	70,000^{^}
Austria (IFPI Austria)	Gold	25,000^{*}
France (SNEP)	Gold	250,000^{*}
Germany (BVMI)	Gold	250,000^{^}
New Zealand (RMNZ)	2× Platinum	60,000^{‡}
Norway (IFPI Norway)	Platinum	10,000^{*}
United Kingdom (BPI)	Platinum	600,000^{‡}
United States (RIAA)	Platinum	1,200,000
^{*} Sales figures based on certification alone.^{^} Shipments figures based on certification alone.^{‡} Sales+streaming figures based on certification alone.

== Release history ==
Region	Date	Format(s)	Label(s)	Ref.
United States	May 1995	12-inch vinyl; CD; cassette	Virgin	
United Kingdom	11 September 1995	12-inch vinyl; CD; cassette	Virgin	
Japan	27 September 1995	CD	Virgin	

== In popular culture ==
The song was featured in the 2006 animated film Barnyard, sung by the character "Biggie Cheese". Alongside its corresponding scene, the song subsequently became an internet meme about a decade later.
