= You Don't Have to Be in the Army to Fight in the War =

Single by Mungo Jerry

from the album You Don't Have to Be in the Army
- B-side: "The Sun Is Shining", "We Shall Be Free", "O'Reilly"
- Released: 1971
- Length: 3:27
- Label: Dawn Records (UK)
- Songwriter: Ray Dorset
- Producer: Barry Murray

Mungo Jerry singles chronology
"Lady Rose" (1971)	"You Don't Have to Be in the Army to Fight in the War" (1971)	"Open-Up" (1971)

Official video
- "You Don't Have To Be In The Army To Fight The War" on YouTube

"You Don't Have to Be in the Army to Fight in the War" is a popular song and hit single by the British group Mungo Jerry, first released in 1971.

== Chart performance ==
Written by the group's lead vocalist Ray Dorset and produced by Barry Murray, it was the band's fourth single. The group's four-piece line-up was augmented by Joe Rush, a long-time friend who had played with them in previous bands and often guested with them on stage, playing washboard.

The song entered the UK Singles Chart at No. 48 in September 1971 and peaked at No. 13 the following month. The song peaked at number 97 in Australia.

Like the group's debut single, "In the Summertime," and following singles, it was a maxi-single playing at 33 rpm, issued in a picture sleeve. Other tracks on the extended play single were "The Sun is Shining" and "We Shall Be Free", a rework of the song recorded by Woody Guthrie and by Lead Belly, and "O'Reilly", both traditional songs adapted by Dorset. In October 1971 it became the title track of their third album.
