= Marsha =

Marsha is a variant spelling of Marcia. Notable people with the name include:

- Marsha Ambrosius (born 1977), former member of the English band duo Floetry
- Marsha Arzberger (born 1937), Democratic politician
- Marsha Barbour, first lady of the U.S. state of Mississippi from 2004 to 2012
- Marsha Berzon (born 1945), federal appeals judge who has served on the Ninth Circuit Court of Appeals since 2000
- Marsha Blackburn (born 1952), Tennessee politician
- Marsha Canham (born 1950), Canadian writer of historical romance novels
- Marsha Cheeks (born 1956), African-American politician from the U.S. state of Michigan
- Marsha Clark, American actress best known for roles in soap operas
- Marsha Coleman-Adebayo, senior policy analyst for the United States Environmental Protection Agency
- Marsha Collier, author, radio personality and educator in making money on eBay and online
- Marsha Courneya, Canadian screenwriter
- Marsha J. Evans (born 1947), retired Rear Admiral in the United States Navy
- Marsha Farney (born 1958), American politician
- Marsha Feinland, third-party candidate (Peace and Freedom Party) for U.S. president in 1996
- Marsha Harris, winner of the 1998 Walter Byers Award as the nation's top female scholar-athlete
- Marsha Henderson, Saint Kitts and Nevis politician
- Marsha Hunt (1917–2022), American film, stage and television actress
- Marsha Hunt (born 1946), American model, singer, novelist and actress
- Marsha Ivins (born 1951), American astronaut and a veteran of five space shuttle missions
- Marsha P. Johnson (1945–1992), African American gay liberation activist, participant in the Stonewall riots
- Marsha I. Lester, American physical chemist
- Marsha M. Linehan (born 1943), American psychologist and author
- Marsha Looper (born 1959), Colorado legislator
- Marsha Marescia (born 1983), field hockey player from South Africa
- Marsha Mason (born 1942), American actress and television director
- Marsha Milan Londoh (born 1985), Malaysian singer and actress
- Marsha Miller (born 1969), retired beach volleyball player from the United States
- Marsha Norman (born 1947), American playwright, screenwriter, and novelist
- Marsha J. Pechman (born 1951), United States federal judge
- Marsha Pelletier (born 1950), American politician
- Marsha Shandur (born 1977), radio presenter, DJ and music manager, who presents on Xfm London and Xfm Manchester
- Marsha Sharp (born 1952), former head coach of Texas Tech University's women's basketball team, the Lady Raiders
- Marsha Singh (1954–2012), politician in the United Kingdom
- Marsha Skrypuch (born 1954), Ukrainian Canadian children's writer who lives in Brantford, Ontario
- Marsha Stevens (born 1952), Christian singer, musician, songwriter and recording artist
- Marsha Swails (born 1952), Minnesota politician and a member of the Minnesota House of Representatives
- Marsha Thomason (born 1976), British actress
- Marsha Thomson (born 1955), Australian politician
- Marsha Thornton (born 1964), American country music singer
- Marsha Vadhanapanich (born 1970), Thai singer, model and actress
- Marsha Waggoner (born 1948), American professional poker player
- Marsha Warfield (born 1954), African-American actress and comedian

== See also ==
- John En Marsha, prime time comedy sitcom in the Philippines during the 1980s
- Marsha, Queen of Diamonds, the fifty-seventh episode of the Batman television series
- Marsha Stern Talmudical Academy, Orthodox Jewish day school in the Washington Heights neighborhood in Manhattan
- Marsha's Scheme of Diamonds, the fifty-eighth episode of the Batman television series
- The Marsha Warfield Show, daytime talk show that aired for two seasons on NBC from 1990 to 1991
- Marsha: Queen of the Mermaids, a character from The Lego Movie and The Lego Movie 2: The Second Part
