= Midnite Lover =

Studio album by Shaggy
- Released: August 26, 1997
- Recorded: 1996–1997
- Genre: Reggae, dancehall
- Length: 43:02
- Label: Virgin
- Producer: O. Burrell

Shaggy chronology
Boombastic (1995)	Midnite Lover (1997)	Hot Shot (2000)

Professional ratings
Review scores
Source	Rating
AllMusic	4/5 stars
Entertainment Weekly	C+
NME	5/10
Rolling Stone	3/5 stars
Smash Hits	3/5 stars
Vibe	(favorable)

Midnite Lover is the fourth studio album released by Jamaican singer Shaggy. The self-produced album became the follow-up to Shaggy's career-making album Boombastic; however, it did not fare as well. The album features covers of Erma Franklin's "Piece of My Heart", and Bob Marley's "Thank You Lord", which features guest vocals from Ky-Mani Marley. 50,000 copies of the album were sold in the UK. "Piece of My Heart" and "My Dream" were the only two singles released from the album.

== Track listing ==
1. "My Dream" – 3:22
2. "Perfect Song" (featuring Maxi Priest) – 3:43
3. "Tender Love" – 3:49
4. "Geenie" (featuring Brian and Tony Gold) – 4:00
5. "Sexy Body Girls" – 3:49
6. "Piece of My Heart" (featuring Marsha) – 4:17
7. "Think Ah So It Go" – 3:30
8. "Midnite Lover" – 3:44
9. "Mission" – 3:49
10. "Way Back Home" – 4:08
11. "John Doe" – 3:40
12. "Thank You Lord" (featuring Ky-Mani) – 3:51
13. "Piece of My Heart" (Urban Remix) – 4:18
