= Boombastic (album) =

Studio album by Shaggy
- Released: July 11, 1995
- Recorded: 1994–1995
- Studio: Digital B Studio (Kingston, Jamaica); HC&F Studio (New York City, United States); Music Works Recording Studio (Kingston, Jamaica)
- Genre: Dancehall; reggae fusion
- Length: 63:33
- Label: Virgin
- Producer: Tony Kelly; Bobby Digital; Robert Livingston

Shaggy chronology
Original Doberman (1994)	Boombastic (1995)	Midnite Lover (1997)

Singles from Boombastic
- 1. "In the Summertime" Released: 1995; 2. "Boombastic" Released: June 5, 1995; 3. "Why You Treat Me So Bad" Released: 1995; 4. "Something Different / The Train Is Coming" Released: 1996

Professional ratings
Review scores
Source	Rating
AllMusic	5/5 stars
Billboard	(favorable)
Entertainment Weekly	B
Knoxville News Sentinel	3/5 stars
Los Angeles Times	3/4 stars
Music & Media	(favorable)
Music Week	4/5 stars
NME	4/10
People Magazine	(favorable)
Rolling Stone	4/5 stars
Vibe	(favorable)
Q	2/5 stars

Boombastic is the third studio album released by Jamaican artist Shaggy. The album was released on July 11, 1995.

The album spawned five singles: "In the Summertime", a remake of the 1970 Mungo Jerry hit, "Boombastic", which peaked at number 1 on the UK Singles Chart, at 3 on the Billboard Hot 100 and at number 1 on the U.S. R&B chart, "Why You Treat Me So Bad", the double A-side "Something Different" / "The Train Is Coming", and "Day Oh", which was released as a Japanese only single. "Boombastic" was used as the theme for a 1995 Levi's ad, which was directed by Michael Mort and Deiniol Morris. It was also used in the 2006 and 2007 films, respectively, Barnyard and Mr. Bean's Holiday. A remake of "In the Summertime" was re-released for the 1996 film Flipper.

== Charts and awards ==
The album won the Grammy Award for Best Reggae Album.

The album was certified platinum in United States and gold in United Kingdom. It peaked at number 34 on the Billboard 200 and topped the Top Reggae Albums chart in the US, and reached number 37 on the UK Albums Chart.

== Track listing ==
1. "In the Summertime" (featuring Rayvon) (Ray Dorset) – 3:57
2. "Boombastic" (Burrell, Floyd, Livingston) – 4:07
3. "Something Different" (featuring Wayne Wonder) (Burrell, Charles, Kelly) – 4:31
4. "Forgive Them Father" (Burrell, Crosdale, Dennis) – 3:27
5. "Heartbreak Suzie" (featuring Gold Mine) (Burrell, Hawthorne) – 4:09
6. "Finger Smith" (Burrell, Crosdale, Dennis) – 3:28
7. "Why You Treat Me So Bad" (featuring Grand Puba) (Burrell, Dixon, Livingston) – 3:47
8. "Woman a Pressure Me" (Burrell, Crosdale, Dennis) – 3:41
9. "The Train Is Coming" (featuring Ken Boothe) (Boothe, Burrell, Livingston) – 3:41
10. "Island Lover" (Burrell, Livingston, Zapata) – 4:13
11. "Day Oh" (Attaway, Burgie) – 3:56
12. "Jenny" (featuring Budda Junky Swan) (Benoiti, Burrel, Pizzonia) – 4:15
13. "How Much More" (Burrell, Kelly) – 3:51
14. "Gal Yu a Pepper" (Burrell, Halliburton) – 4:18

Japanese bonus track

15. "Demand The Ride"

US bonus tracks

15. "In the Summertime" (Rayvon & The Ripper Remix) – 4:04
16. "Boombastic" (Sting Remix) – 4:14

== Personnel ==
- Les King – engineer
- John Raf Allen – tracking
- Ken Boothe – performer
- Kent Bryan – background vocals, tracking
- Jake Chessum – photography
- Gemma Corfield – executive producer
- Paul Crosdale – tracking
- Duley Culture – background vocals
- Bobby "Digital" Dixon – producer, engineer
- Bobby Dixon – producer, engineer
- Tom Dolan – art direction, design
- Brian & Tony Gold – background vocals
- Grand Puba – performer
- Anastas Hackett – tracking
- Dennis Halliburton – engineer, mixing, tracking
- Tony Kelly – producer, engineer, tracking
- Marty Kersich – horn overdubs
- Robert Livingston – producer, executive producer, tracking
- Lynford "Fatta" Marshall – mixing
- George "Dusty" Miller – tracking
- Kimbalyn Miller – background vocals
- Dr. Marshall Murphey – engineer, background vocals, overdubs, mixing
- Robert Murphy – engineer, mixing
- Wayne Nicholson – engineer
- Shaun "Sting Int'l" Pizzonia – background vocals, producer, engineer, overdubs, mixing
- Rayvon – performer
- Glen Ricks – background vocals
- Wayne Wonder – performer
- Collin "Bulbie" York – mixing
- Robert Zapata – background vocals, producer, tracking

== Charts ==
=== Weekly charts ===
Weekly chart performance for Boombastic
Chart (1995–1996)	Peak position
Australian Albums (ARIA)	11
Austrian Albums (Ö3 Austria)	25
Dutch Albums (Album Top 100)	30
German Albums (Offizielle Top 100)	24
New Zealand Albums (RMNZ)	10
Swedish Albums (Sverigetopplistan)	43
Swiss Albums (Schweizer Hitparade)	35
UK Albums (OCC)	37
UK R&B Albums (OCC)	7
US Billboard 200	34
US Top R&B/Hip-Hop Albums (Billboard)	11
US Reggae Albums (Billboard)	1

=== Year-end charts ===
Year-end chart performance for Boombastic
Chart (1995)	Position
US Billboard 200	163
US Top R&B/Hip-Hop Albums (Billboard)	84

== Certifications and sales ==
Certifications and sales for Boombastic
Region	Certification	Certified units/sales
Brazil (Pro-Música Brasil)	Gold	100,000^{*}
Canada (Music Canada)	Gold	50,000^{^}
Malaysia	—	150,000
Sweden (GLF)	Gold	50,000^{^}
United Kingdom (BPI)	Silver	60,000^{^}
United States (RIAA)	Platinum	1,000,000^{^}
^{*} Sales figures based on certification alone.^{^} Shipments figures based on certification alone.
