= Al Weisel =

American writer (1963–2010)

Al Weisel (July 18, 1963 – February 27, 2010) was an American freelance writer who lived in New York City.

Weisel graduated from Columbia University in 1987. He wrote for Rolling Stone, The Washington Post, New York Newsday, and Us Magazine. He also wrote for Premiere, Spin, Tracks, George, Travel & Leisure, Out, Time Out New York, and the Bulletin (Australia). From 1999 to 2002 he was the Movies Editor at CDNow where he launched the video/DVD section.

In October 2005, he published Live Fast, Die Young: The Wild Ride of Making Rebel Without a Cause, a book he co-authored with Larry Frascella, which explores the making of the film Rebel Without a Cause and in particular the relationships between director Nicholas Ray and leading actors James Dean and Natalie Wood. He authored a satirical political blog under the pseudonym Jon Swift. There he wrote: "I am a reasonable conservative who likes to write about politics and culture. Since the media is biased I get all my news from Fox News, Rush Limbaugh and Jay Leno monologues."

He died on February 27, 2010, after suffering a severe stroke while undergoing surgery for an aortic dissection.
