= Ray Dorset =

British guitarist and singer (born 1946)

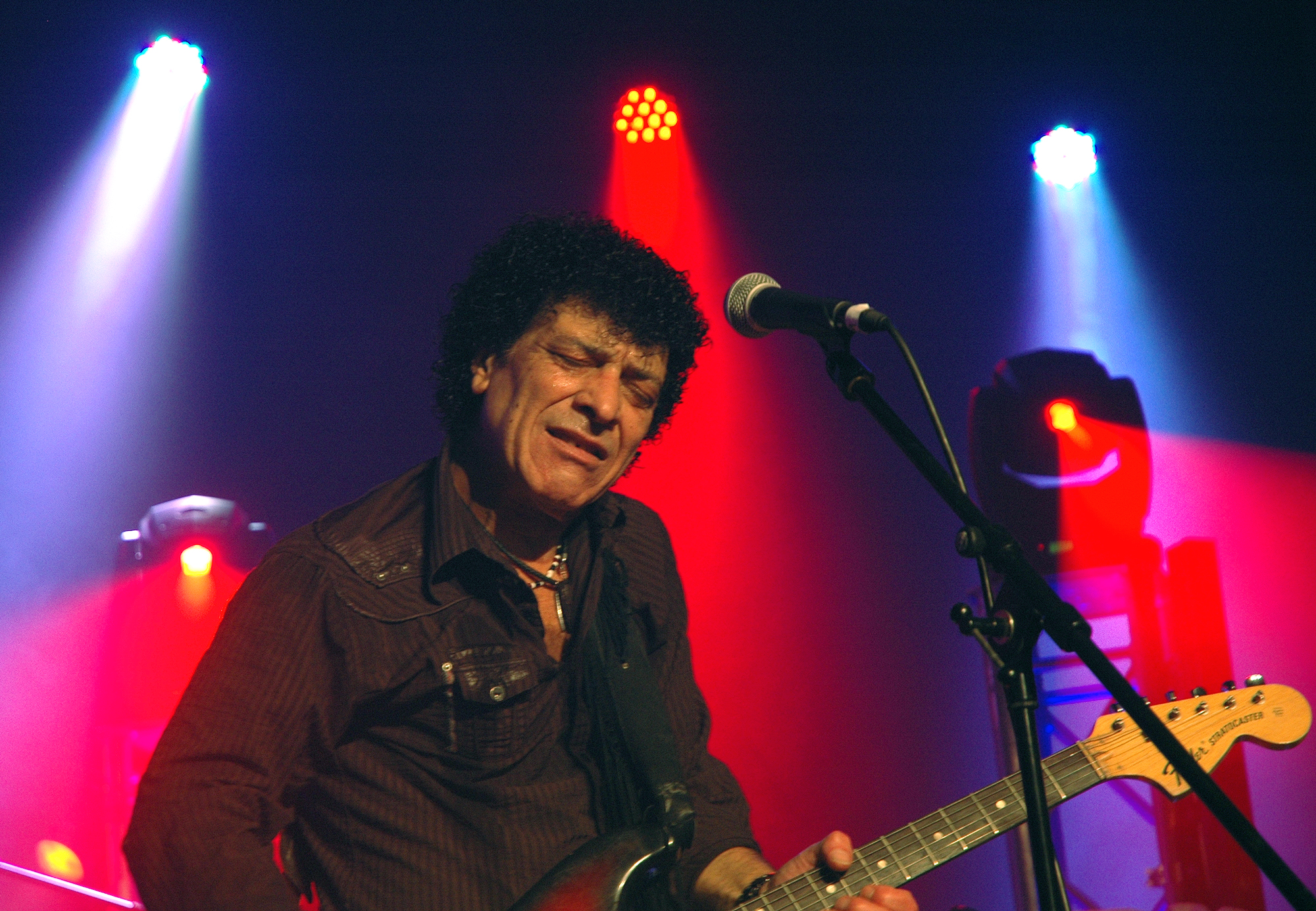
- Dorset in 2013

Background information
- Born: Raymond Edward Dorset; 21 March 1946 (age 80); Ashford, Middlesex, England
- Genres: British skiffle; Rock
- Occupations: Singer-songwriter; guitarist
- Instruments: Vocals; guitar; harmonica; kazoo; keyboards
- Years active: 1968–present
- Member of: Mungo Jerry
- Formerly of: Katmandu

Ray Dorset (born 21 March 1946) is a British guitarist, singer, songwriter, and founder of Mungo Jerry.

He composed most of the songs for the band, including the hit singles "In the Summertime", "Baby Jump", "Lady Rose", "You Don't Have to Be in the Army to Fight in the War", "Long Legged Woman Dressed in Black", and "Hello Nadine", with "Feels Like I'm in Love" becoming a number one hit single for the Scottish disco singer Kelly Marie.

== Early life ==
Dorset attended Stanwell Road School (which was renamed Abbotsford County Secondary School, and then Southall Secondary School), from the age of 13 after passing the eleven plus exam. He formed The Blue Moon Skiffle Group as a teenager.

He worked as an apprentice hairdresser for nine months after leaving the school without qualifications. After this he studied for a City and Guilds qualification at Twickenham College of Technology and worked for Radio Control Specialists Ltd, National Works, Bath Road, Hounslow, a firm that manufactured radio control equipment for models and film work as well as electro-mechanical components.

== Music career ==
In 1968, Dorset formed the group Good Earth, which included Colin Earl on keyboards, Dave Hutchins on bass, and Ray Bowerman on drums. They recorded the album It's Hard Rock And All That on the Saga record label, before Hutchins and Bowerman left. Joe Rush joined on washboard and the group adopted a more acoustic-based skiffle style.

In 1970, with further line-up changes, the group became Mungo Jerry with hits to follow such as "In the Summertime". The song took Dorset only ten minutes to compose on a second-hand Fender Stratocaster while he was taking time off work from his regular job, working in a laboratory for Timex.

Dorset has also maintained a solo career parallel to his leadership of Mungo Jerry. In 1972, he released the album Cold Blue Excursion, made up entirely of self-penned songs, many featuring strings and brass accompaniment. In 1983, he was part of one-off blues outfit Katmandu with Peter Green and Vincent Crane, who recorded an album A Case for the Blues. In 1986, billed as 'Made in England', he recorded and released the theme tune for the TV drama series Prospects, which was also released as a single.

One song recorded by Mungo Jerry, "Feels Like I'm in Love", was originally written by Dorset with Elvis Presley in mind shortly before he died. In 1979 it was recorded by the Scottish disco singer Kelly Marie, and became a UK number one in September 1980. This made Dorset one of the first songwriters to top the UK Singles Chart with singles performed by himself, and by another musician.

== Later disputes ==
In 2012, Dorset sued his former management company Associated Music International (AMI) for over £2 million in royalties from the 1973 song "Alright, Alright, Alright" which he believed had been wrongfully kept from him. During the course of the proceedings Dorset denied harassing his ex-manager by singing in an "antisemitic" video entitled "Nail that Snail." In 2017, the High Court ordered Dorset to pay AMI a sum of £33,600, finding that he had misrepresented the ownership rights to the song. It did not order that royalties be paid to AMI.

== Personal life ==
A father of six, Dorset lives with his third wife, Britta, in Bournemouth, Dorset. Interviewed in 2014, Dorset said, "Each of my three marriages has produced two children and I also have three grandchildren. I married my present wife, Britta, in 1995. We sold our home in her native Germany and moved completely to Bournemouth, where we’ve been based since 1994 and own two houses and a restaurant. I should be retired, but my brain is like that of an 18-year-old."

Dorset is a Freemason and a member of Chelsea Lodge No. 3098.

In 2016, Dorset said that he had suffered from irritable bowel syndrome for over 45 years, partly blaming the "rock 'n' roll lifestyle" that he enjoyed after the success of "In the Summertime".

In June 2021 Dorset said, during an interview with radio and TV presenter Mike Read, that he had recovered from open-heart surgery. He added that he no longer had his trademark sideburns, because they had been difficult to manage in hospital, and that although all his hair was real, he dyed it.
