= In the Summertime =

1970 single by Mungo Jerry

Single by Mungo Jerry

from the album Electronically Tested
- B-side: "Mighty Man"
- Released: June 1970
- Studio: Pye (London, UK)
- Genre: Skiffle; pop
- Length: 3:30
- Label: Dawn
- Songwriter: Ray Dorset
- Producer: Barry Murray

Mungo Jerry singles chronology
"In the Summertime" (1970)	"Baby Jump" (1971)

"In the Summertime" is the debut single by British rock band Mungo Jerry, released in 1970. It reached number one in charts around the world, including seven weeks on the UK Singles Chart, two weeks at number one on the Canadian charts, and number three on the Billboard Hot 100 singles chart in the US. Written and composed by the band's lead singer, Ray Dorset, while working in a lab for Timex, the lyrics of the song celebrate the carefree days of summer.

== Composition and recording ==
Dorset has said that the song took only ten minutes to write, which he did using a second-hand Fender Stratocaster, while he was taking time off from his regular job, working in a lab for Timex.

The song was recorded in Pye Studio 1 with Barry Murray producing. Initially it was only two minutes long; to make it longer, Murray played the recording twice, slightly remixing the second half, and put the sound of a motorcycle in the middle. In an interview with Gary James, Dorset explained that they couldn't find a recording of a motorcycle, but that "Howard Barrow, the engineer had an old, well, it wasn't old then, a Triumph sports car, which he drove past the studio while Barry Marrit [sic] was holding the microphone. So, he got the stereo effects from left to right or right to left, whatever. And that was it."

Dorset has suggested that it was the first number one song to employ "beatbox" percussion.

== Release ==
The initial UK release was on Dawn Records, a new label launched by Pye. It was unusual in that it was a maxi single, playing at 33 1/3 rpm, whereas singles generally played at 45 rpm. It included an additional song also written and composed by Dorset, "Mighty Man", on the A-side, and a much longer track, the Woody Guthrie song "Dust Pneumonia Blues", on the B-side. As the record was sold in a picture sleeve, also not standard at the time, and sold at only a few pence more than the normal 45 rpm two-track single, it was considered value for money. A small quantity of 45 rpm discs on the Pye record label, with "Mighty Man" on the B-side, and without a picture sleeve, were pressed for use in jukeboxes. These are now rare collector's items.

In 2012, Dorset sued his former management company Associated Music International, run by his former friend and business manager Eliot Cohen, claiming over £2 million in royalties from the song that he believed had been withheld from him.

== Personnel ==
Credits adapted from the single liner notes for "In the Summertime".

- Ray Dorset – vocals, electric guitar, 6-string acoustic, cabasa, stomp
- Paul King – banjo, jug
- Colin Earl – piano
- Mike Cole – string bass

== Charts ==
=== Weekly charts ===
Chart (1970)	Peak position
Australia (Go-Set National Top 60)	1
Australia (Kent Music Report)	1
Austria (Ö3 Austria Top 40)	1
Belgium (Ultratop 50 Flanders)	1
Canada Top Singles (RPM)	1
Denmark (IFPI)	1
France (CIDD)	1
Ireland (IRMA)	1
Italy (FIMI)	1
Mexico	1
Netherlands (Dutch Top 40)	1
Netherlands (Single Top 100)	1
New Zealand (RIANZ)	1
Norway (VG-lista)	1
South Africa (Springbok Radio)	1
Sweden	1
Switzerland (Schweizer Hitparade)	1
UK Singles (Official Charts)	1
US Billboard Hot 100	3
US Adult Contemporary (Billboard)	30
US Cash Box Top 100	2
US Record World Top 100	1
West Germany (GfK)	1

=== Year-end charts ===
Chart (1970)	Rank
Australia (Kent Music Report)	16
Austria (Ö3 Austria Top 40)	2
Belgium (Ultratop 50 Flanders)	4
Canada Top Singles (RPM)	7
France (IFOP)	2
Netherlands (Dutch Top 40)	4
South Africa (Springbok Radio)	2
Switzerland (Schweizer Hitparade)	2
UK Singles (OCC)	1
US Billboard Hot 100	53
US Cash Box Top 100	35

== Certifications and sales ==
Certifications and sales for "In the Summertime"
Region	Certification	Certified units/sales
Australia (ARIA)	Gold	50,000
Denmark	—	55,000
France	—	1,110,000
Germany (BVMI)	Gold	500,000^{^}
New Zealand (RMNZ)	Platinum	30,000^{‡}
Norway	—	20,000
Sweden	—	100,000
United Kingdom Original release	—	800,000
United Kingdom (BPI) 2005 release	Gold	400,000^{‡}
United States (RIAA)	Gold	1,000,000^{^}
Summaries
Scandinavia	—	175,000
^{^} Shipments figures based on certification alone.^{‡} Sales+streaming figures based on certification alone.

== The Mixtures version ==
"In the Summertime"

Single by the Mixtures

from the album In the Summertime
- B-side: "Where You Are"
- Released: 1970
- Length: 2:37
- Label: Fable
- Songwriter: Ray Dorset
- Producer: June Productions Of Australia Pty. Ltd.

The Mixtures singles chronology
"Here Comes Love Again" (1969)	"In the Summertime" (1970)	"The Pushbike Song" (1970)

In 1970, Australian rock band the Mixtures covered and released the song. The song replaced Mungo Jerry's version at number one on the Australian chart, where it remained at number one for six weeks. It was the biggest-selling single by an Australian artist in Australia in 1970 and number three overall.

=== Charts ===
==== Weekly charts ====
Chart (1970)	Peak position
Australia (Go-Set National Top 40)	1
Australia (Kent Music Report)	1

==== Year-end charts ====
Chart (1970)	Rank
Australia (Kent Music Report)	3
Australian Artist (Kent Music Report)	1

== Shaggy version ==
"In the Summertime"

Single by Shaggy featuring Rayvon

from the album Boombastic and Flipper Soundtrack
- A-side: "Boombastic" (US only)
- B-side: "It No Matter"; "Gal You a Pepper"
- Released: 26 June 1995 (UK)
- Genre: Reggae
- Length: 3:46
- Label: Virgin
- Songwriter: Ray Dorset
- Producers: Sting International; Robert Livingston

Shaggy singles chronology
"Lately" (1994)	"In the Summertime" (1995)	"Boombastic" (1995)

Music video
- "In the Summertime" on YouTube

"In the Summertime" ('96 Version)
- Single cover for the re-recorded version

In 1995, Jamaican-American reggae musician Shaggy covered the song, and released it in June that year by Virgin Records as the lead single from his third studio album, Boombastic (1995). Aside from the addition of rap lyrics, Shaggy's version also substitutes other lyrics for the song's original line "have a drink, have a drive." He also performed the song on an episode of Baywatch. A year after its release, the song was re-recorded and released specifically for the film Flipper under the title "In the Summertime" ('96 version).

=== Critical reception ===
Pan-European magazine Music & Media complimented Shaggy's cover version as a "tasty remake". Roger Morton from NME felt the musician had covered "In the Summertime" "in fine jagga-jug band/who gives a shit style." Al Weisel from Rolling Stone described it as "a bouncy, infectious remake of the 1970 Mungo Jerry hit, [that] alternates a soulful chorus with a rapid-fire rap a la Chaka Demus and Pliers' 'Murder She Wrote'."

=== Track listings ===
==== United Kingdom ====
- CD single
1. "In the Summertime" (single edit) – 3:46
2. "It No Matter" – 3:56
3. "Gal You a Pepper" – 3:37
4. "In the Summertime" (Sting vs. Shaggy remix) – 4:40
- 7-inch vinyl and cassette
1. "In the Summertime" (single edit) – 3:46
2. "It No Matter" – 3:56
- 12-inch vinyl
1. "In the Summertime" (Sting vs. Shaggy remix) – 4:40
2. "In the Summertime" (LP version) – 3:55
3. "In the Summertime" (Drum Dancehall mix) – 3:54
- 1996 "Flipper" CD single
1. "In the Summertime '96" (original version) – 3:52
2. "In the Summertime '96" (instrumental) – 3:52
3. "Flipper Main Theme" – 3:58

==== United States ====
- CD single
1. "In the Summertime" (single edit) – 3:48
2. "In the Summertime" (LP version) – 3:55
3. "In the Summertime" (Drum Dancehall mix) – 3:54
4. "In the Summertime" (Funk Dance mix) – 3:58
5. "Boombastic" (LP version) – 4:05
6. "Boombastic" (Sting remix) – 4:18
- 12-inch vinyl
1. "In the Summertime" (LP version) – 3:55
2. "In the Summertime" (Drum Dancehall mix) – 3:54
3. "In the Summertime" (Funk Dance mix) – 3:58
4. "Boombastic" (Sting remix) – 4:18

=== Charts ===
==== Weekly charts ====
Chart (1995)	Peak position
Australia (ARIA)	14
Austria (Ö3 Austria Top 40)	35
Belgium (Ultratop 50 Flanders)	32
El Salvador (UPI)	5
Europe (European Dance Radio)	23
Europe (European Hit Radio)	6
Finland (Suomen virallinen lista)	7
Germany (GfK)	60
Hungary (Mahasz)	2
Ireland (IRMA)	13
Netherlands (Dutch Top 40)	23
Netherlands (Single Top 100)	21
New Zealand (Recorded Music NZ)	4
Poland Airplay (Music & Media)	3
Scottish Singles Sales (Official Charts)	21
Sweden (Sverigetopplistan)	30
UK Singles (Official Charts)	5
UK Pop Tip Club Chart (Music Week)	20
US Billboard Hot 100 with "Boombastic"	3
US Dance Singles Sales (Billboard) with "Boombastic"	2
US Hot R&B/Hip-Hop Songs (Billboard) with "Boombastic"	1
US Hot Rap Songs (Billboard) with "Boombastic"	1
US Cash Box Top 100 with "Boombastic"	3

==== Year-end charts ====
Chart (1995)	Rank
Latvia (Latvijas Top 50)	107
New Zealand (RIANZ)	21
UK Singles (OCC)	73
US Billboard Hot 100	18
US Hot R&B Singles (Billboard)	9
US Hot Rap Singles (Billboard)	7
US Maxi-Singles Sales (Billboard)	8
US Cash Box Top 100	23

=== Certifications ===
Region	Certification	Certified units/sales
New Zealand (RMNZ)	Gold	5,000^{*}
New Zealand (RMNZ) Sales + streams	Gold	15,000^{‡}
United Kingdom (BPI)	Silver	200,000^{‡}
^{*} Sales figures based on certification alone.^{‡} Sales+streaming figures based on certification alone.

=== Release history ===
Region	Version	Date	Format(s)	Label(s)	Ref.
United States	with "Boombastic"	1995	12-inch vinyl; CD	Virgin	
United Kingdom	Solo	26 June 1995	CD; cassette	Virgin	
Japan	Solo	5 July 1995	CD	Virgin	
Australia	Solo	24 July 1995	CD	Virgin	
United States	Solo	30 April 1996	Contemporary hit radio	Virgin	

== In other media ==
The song's lyric "have a drink, have a drive, go out and see what you can find" led to its use in 1992 in a UK advert for the campaign Drinking and Driving Wrecks Lives. It featured the first verse against people enjoying drinks in a pub during summer, then stopped to show a fatal car accident caused by drunk driving.

"In the Summertime" has been featured in many feature-length films including 29th Street, Twin Town, The Substitute, Drowning Mona, Mr. Deeds, Stolen Summer, Anita and Me, Wedding Crashers, Wild About Harry, Despicable Me 2, and Dog Days, and X.

== See also ==
- List of 1970s one-hit wonders in the United States
- List of Billboard number-one rap singles of the 1980s and 1990s
- List of Dutch Top 40 number-one singles of 1970
- List of number-one singles in Australia during the 1970s
- List of number-one singles of 1970 (Canada)
- List of number-one singles of 1970 (France)
- List of number-one hits of 1970 (Germany)
- List of number-one singles of 1970 (Ireland)
- List of number-one hits of 1970 (Italy)
- List of number-one hits of 1970 (Mexico)
- List of number-one singles in 1970 (New Zealand)
- List of number-one singles of 1970 (Spain)
- List of number-one singles from 1968 to 1979 (Switzerland)
- List of number-one R&B singles of 1995 (U.S.)
- List of UK Singles Chart number ones of the 1970s
- VG-lista 1964 to 1994
