= Mungo Jerry =

British rock band

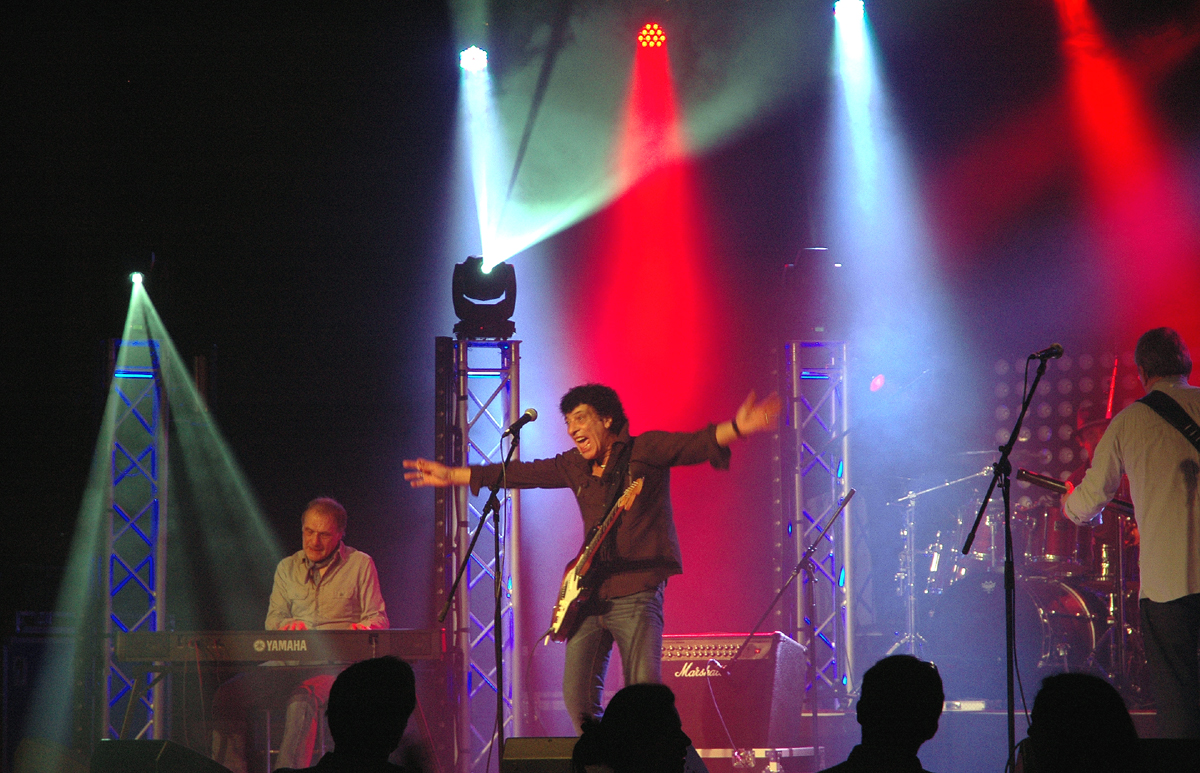
- Mungo Jerry performing in 2013

Background information
- Also known as: Mungo Jerry Blues Band
- Origin: Ashford, Middlesex, England
- Genres: Rock; folk; blues; country
- Years active: 1970–present
- Labels: Janus; Dawn; Polydor; Scratch; Stage Coach; Mach 1; Orbit; Illegal; Universal Music; Mercury; 7A Records
- Members: Ray Dorset aka Mungo Jerry; Torsten Luederwaldt; Bob White; Adam Davy; Darren Jones; Franky Klassen; Toby Hounsham; Jon Playle
- Past members: Colin Earl; Paul King; Mike Cole; John Godfrey; Joe Rush; Michael Pohl; Bob Daisley; Byron Contostavlos; Paul Raymond; Boris Williams; Dave Bidwell; Dick Middleton; Eric Dillon; Ian Milne; Paul Hancox; Sev Lewkowicz; Jamei Roberts; Tim Green; Chris Warnes; Jon Pope; Peter Sullivan; Tim Hubbard; John Cook; Jon Storey; John Brunning; Alan Johnson
- Website: mungojerry.com

Mungo Jerry (formerly known as "Good Earth") is a British folk rock, blues, and country music band/artist formed by Ray Dorset in Ashford, Middlesex, in 1970.

Mungo Jerry's biggest hit was "In the Summertime", which sold over 30 million units worldwide. Mungo Jerry had nine charting singles in the UK, including two number ones, five top-20 hits in South Africa, and four in the Top 100 in Canada.

== History ==
=== Formation and original band: 1970–1971 ===
Mungo Jerry came to prominence in May 1970, after their performances at the Hollywood Music Festival at Newcastle-under-Lyme, Staffordshire. Their name was inspired by the poem "Mungojerrie and Rumpleteazer" from T. S. Eliot's Old Possum's Book of Practical Cats. They performed alongside Black Sabbath, Traffic, Ginger Baker's Air Force, the Grateful Dead (their first performance in the UK) and José Feliciano. Their 23 May show was well received and the organisers asked them to perform again on the following day. The band's first single, "In the Summertime", the first maxi single in the world, released on 22 May, entered the UK charts at No. 13 and the following week went straight to No. 1. Ray Dorset had to ask his boss for time off to do the BBC Show Top of the Pops.

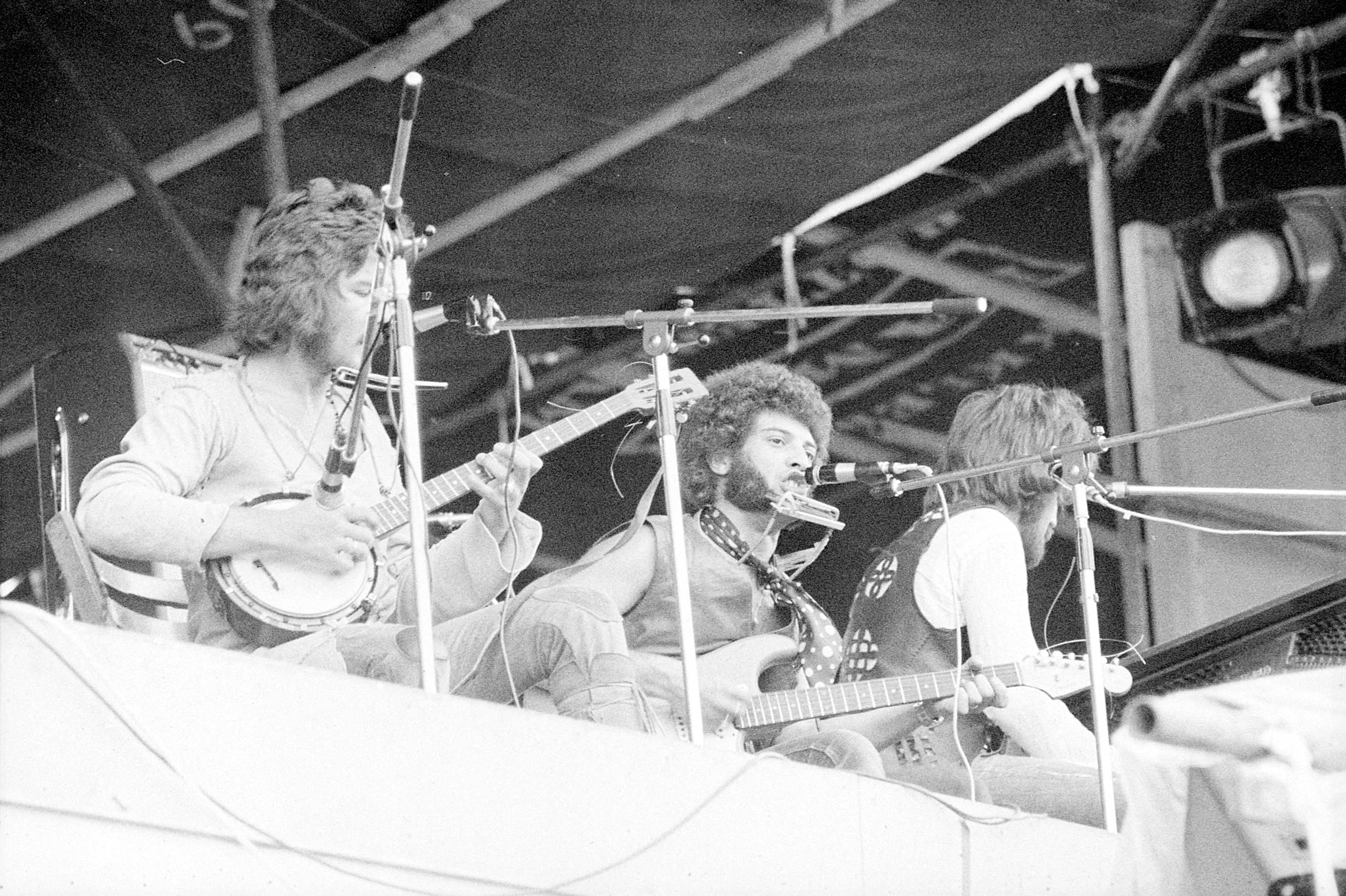
Performance at Kralingen Music Festival, 1970

Ray Dorset and Colin Earl had previously been members of The Good Earth. Bassist Dave Hutchins left to join Bobby Parker's band, and the drummer was dismissed, so Dorset and Earl decided to fulfil the one remaining gig, an Oxford University Christmas Ball in December 1968, as a three-piece with Joe Rush, one of Dorset's colleagues, on double bass. Also on the bill was Miller Anderson, making his debut as a singer and guitarist, and Mick Farren and the Social Deviants. Though booked for only one set, Good Earth were asked to perform another after the bands had finished, playing a selection of American folk/blues/skiffle/jug band music from Lead Belly, Woody Guthrie and others, and some of Dorset's songs.

The trio played more gigs and landed a regular slot at the Master Robert Motel in Osterley, Middlesex, where they soon built up a following, including banjo, guitar and blues harp player Paul King who eventually joined the band, making it a four-piece.

After Rush left, Mike Cole was recruited on double bass, and this line-up recorded the first seventeen Mungo Jerry tracks which made up the first album and maxi-single including "In the Summertime". When they made their national debut at the Hollywood Festival, Rush joined them on stage for some numbers to play washboard. The record topped the UK Singles Chart for seven weeks.

According to Joseph Murrell's The Book of Golden Discs (1978), "Mungomania" was possibly the most startling and unpredictable pop phenomenon to hit Britain since The Beatles.

Mungo Jerry made their first trip to the United States in September 1970. On their return Mike Cole was fired and replaced by John Godfrey, who played bass on their second UK maxi-single, "Baby Jump", which also topped the UK chart in March 1971. The third UK single, another maxi, "Lady Rose", was also released in 1971.

=== Line-up changes and side-projects: 1972–1980s ===
Eventually, Dorset found the group's good-time blues and jug band repertoire restricting, and in 1972 - before the split of the original band - he released a solo album, Cold Blue Excursion, with his songs backed by strings and brass and, in one instance, a jazz band. His intention to broaden the group's appeal by recruiting a drummer led to King and Earl trying to sack him, but the management, regarding Dorset as inseparable in the public eye from Mungo Jerry, fired them both instead. Dorset and Godfrey, the bassist, recruited new members and presented a new sound, heard on the fourth album Boot Power. Ray Dorset got the "Mungo Jerry"-name as an artist and was able now to change the members of his band for the sound he wanted for the future. Colin Earl and Paul King went on to form The King Earl Boogie Band and recorded an album at Richard Branson's Manor Studio called Trouble at Mill, produced by Dave Cousins of Strawbs. Their June 1972 single "Plastic Jesus" was banned by the BBC. They played together on and off in the years following and ended up with a band called Skeleton Crew.

Mungo Jerry's hits continued through to 1976 with "Open Up" (Top Twenty in Europe); "Alright, Alright, Alright" (a rewrite of an old French hit for Jacques Dutronc, and again a major hit worldwide reaching the Top 3 in the UK); "Wild Love"; "Long-Legged Woman Dressed in Black", "Hello Nadine" (European hit and Top Five in Canada), and "It's a Secret" (European hit). "You Don't Have to Be in the Army to Fight in the War" gave Mungo Jerry another hit.

In 1975, Earl returned to play keyboards, drummer Peter Sullivan joined and percussion player Joe Rush, part-time member of the band in earlier days, also came back for a while. Mungo Jerry's band-line up continued to change. Among those who have played with them are bassist Bob Daisley, drummers Dave Bidwell, Paul Hancox and Boris Williams, guitarist Dick Middleton, keyboard player Sev Lewkowicz, and keyboard/accordion player Steve Jones.

In 1980, another Dorset song, "Feels Like I'm in Love", originally written for Elvis Presley, and recorded by the band as a B side of a single, became a British number one hit for Kelly Marie. Mungo Jerry remained successful with overseas hits like "On a Night Like This", "Knockin' on Heaven's Door" (a reggae version of the Bob Dylan song) and "Sunshine Reggae" (British version by Mungo Jerry & Horizon).

In 1983, Mungo Jerry aka Dorset was part of the blues super-group Katmandu, which recorded A Case for the Blues, with guitarist Peter Green, formerly of Fleetwood Mac, and keyboard player Vincent Crane, formerly of Atomic Rooster and The Crazy World of Arthur Brown.

=== 1980s–2020s ===
Mungo Jerry is still publishing new music and is part live of pop and blues-festivals worldwide. "In The Summertime" was covered in 1995 by Shaggy (with musical input from Mungo Jerry) as a world-hit again - and also in Britain 2010 by Mungo Jerry with Bluestone and DJ Skibadee (Top 20 hit in Britain's Dance Chart). Other hits entered the Top 20 of the International Heritage Chart in the 2020s, like "That´s the Colour of Love", "That´s Why I´m So in Love with You" and "Always Time for Coffee".

Mungo Jerry LPs from the 1990-years until 2026 include

- "Snakebite" (re-released after its 90s-success in 2025 via 7A records ) - with the Single "Snakebite" (Top Twenty International Heritage Chart)
- "Cool Jesus" (2011), "Xstreme" (2019)
- "Touch the Sky" (2019)
- "Somelight" (2022)

Mungo Jerry released in the 2010s also two live-LPs, a CD from the Bansko-Jazz-Festival and a CD from a radio-gig in Germany from 2016. In May 2026 the group released the album Undefinable and the single "Stand Up".

Original keyboard player Colin Earl (also part time-musician in the band Foghat) died after a short illness in February 2025 aged 82.

== Members ==
Current members of Mungo Jerry's band

- Ray Dorset aka Mungo Jerry – vocals, guitars
- Torsten Luederwaldt - keyboards, banjo
- Toby Hounsham - keyboards
- Darren Jones - bass
- Jon Playle - bass
- Bob White - drums
- Franky Klassen - cello

Former members

- Colin Earl – piano (original member) (1942–2025)
- Paul King – banjo, jug (original member)
- Mike Cole – bass (original member)
- John Godfrey – bass (1945–2014)
- Joe Rush – percussion (1940–2020)
- Bob Daisley – bass
- Chrissie Stewart – bass
- James Matthews – bass
- Ray Davies – bass (UK Players vocalist and bassist)
- Byron Contostavlos – bass (died 2007)
- Plato Contostavlos – keyboards (died 2025)
- Paul Raymond – keyboards, guitars (died 2019)
- Boris Williams – drums
- Dave Bidwell – drums (died 1977)
- Dick Middleton – guitars
- Eric Dillon – drums
- Ian Milne – piano
- Paul Hancox – drums
- Sev Lewkowicz – keyboards
- Jamei Roberts – drums
- Tim Green – guitars, harmonica
- Chris Warnes – bass
- Jon Pope – keyboards
- Peter Sullivan – drums
- Tim Reeves – drums
- John Cook – piano and clavinet
- Jon Storey – guitar
- Alan Johnson – guitar
- Michael Pohl – guitar
- John Brunning – guitar
- Phil Swan – guitar/vocals

== Discography ==
- Mungo Jerry (1970)
- Electronically Tested/Baby Jump (1971)
- You Don't Have to Be in the Army (1971)
- Boot Power (1972)
- Long Legged Woman (1974)
- Impala Saga (1976)
- Lovin' in the Alleys, Fightin' in the Streets (1977)
- Ray Dorset & Mungo Jerry (1978)
- Together Again (1981)
- Boogie Up (1984)
- Snakebite (1991)
- Old Shoes New Jeans (1997)
- Candy Dreams (2001)
- Adults Only (2003)
- Naked from the Heart (2007)
- When She Comes She Runs All Over Me (2007)
- Cool Jesus (2011)
- Kicking Back (2015)
- Mungo Jerry 100% live/ Radio Concert ARD/SWR (2016)
- Xstreme (2019)
- Touch The Sky (2019)
- Somelight (2022)
- Snakebite - Revisited (2025)
- Undefinable (2026)

== See also ==
- List of 1970s one-hit wonders in the United States
