= List of programs broadcast by VH1 =

VH1's current logo since 2020.

This is a list of programs currently broadcast or will air soon or formerly aired on VH1.

== Current ==
Title	Premiere date	Current season	Source(s)
Nick Cannon Presents: Wild 'n Out	July 7, 2019	21	

=== Acquired programming ===
- My Wife and Kids
- America’s Funniest Home Videos
- Everybody Hates Chris
- Flip Side

== Former ==
=== Music television ===
Title	Premiere date	End date
VH1 Top 20 Video Countdown	October 28, 1994	November 28, 2015
Pop-Up Video	October 27, 1996	September 21, 2012
Crossroads (Note: Originally titled Darcy's Music)	October 31, 1994	1998
8-Track Flashback	September 23, 1995	February 15, 1998
VH1 Dance Machine	1997	1998
100 Greatest Women of Rock & Roll	July 26, 1999	July 30, 1999
Emma	October 8, 1999	November 5, 1999
Insomniac Music Theater	1999	2005
Nocturnal State	August 2005	April 30, 2010
Jump Start	September 2003	June 30, 2013
VH1 Plus Music	July 1, 2013	December 20, 2015
SoundClash	July 23, 2014	July 30, 2014

=== Docuseries ===
Title	Premiere date	End date
VH1's Legends	1995	2001
VH1 Storytellers	June 2, 1996	January 24, 2015
VH1 Video Timeline	June 3, 1998	March 23, 2001
Behind the Music (Note: Moved to Paramount+)	August 17, 1997	July 16, 2014
Where Are They Now?	June 7, 1999	November 28, 2002
Driven	2001	October 16, 2006
VH1 All Access	2001	2008
Ultimate Albums	March 10, 2002	January 24, 2005
VH1 Goes Inside...	January 16, 2003	April 8, 2006
The Fabulous Life of...	May 1, 2003	June 19, 2013
Retrosexual: The '80s	November 14, 2004	November 19, 2004
My Coolest Years	November 23, 2004	January 4, 2005
Game Show Moments Gone Bananas	May 21, 2005	June 18, 2005
Lords of the Revolution	August 10, 2009	August 14, 2009
Famous Crime Scene	February 12, 2010	March 26, 2010
The Ride	April 18, 2015	April 18, 2015
Infamy: When Fame Turns Deadly	June 7, 2021	N/A
My True Crime Story	August 2, 2021	August 4, 2025
My Secret Scam Story	November 6, 2023	N/A
Nick Cannon Presents: Future Superstars	November 21, 2023	December 19, 2023

=== Reality/Unscripted ===
Title	Premiere date	End date
Bands on the Run	April 2, 2001	July 15, 2001
Surviving Nugent	2003	2004
Bands Reunited	January 19, 2004	January 1, 2006
In Search of the Partridge Family	September 5, 2004	December 12, 2004
Totally Obsessed	September 5, 2004	?
The Surreal Life (Note: Originally aired on The WB) (Note: Moved to MTV)	September 5, 2004	November 21, 2022
Motormouth	October 26, 2004	October 28, 2004
Strange Love	January 9, 2005	April 24, 2005
Celebrity Fit Club	January 9, 2005	April 5, 2010
Kept	May 29, 2005	August 4, 2005
Hogan Knows Best	July 10, 2005	October 21, 2007
Breaking Bonaduce	September 11, 2005	December 17, 2006
My Fair Brady	September 11, 2005	March 9, 2008
Hollywood Snappers	November 7, 2005	December 12, 2005
But Can They Sing?	October 30, 2005	December 4, 2005
Flavor of Love	January 1, 2006	May 26, 2008
So Notorious	April 2, 2006	May 14, 2006
Can't Get a Date (Note: Moved to Logo)	April 7, 2006	May 26, 2006
Supergroup	May 21, 2006	July 2, 2006
Ice-T's Rap School	October 20, 2006	November 17, 2006
The Wendy Williams Experience	October 20, 2006	December 9, 2006
Celebrity Paranormal Project	October 22, 2006	December 17, 2006
The Fabulous Life Presents: Really Rich Real Estate	November 13, 2006	December 11, 2006
Shooting Sizemore	January 7, 2007	February 18, 2007
Ego Trip's The (White) Rapper Show	January 8, 2007	February 26, 2007
I Love New York	January 8, 2007	January 6, 2008
The Surreal Life: Fame Games	January 8, 2007	March 25, 2007
The Agency	February 20, 2007	April 3, 2007
Dice: Undisputed	March 4, 2007	April 1, 2007
Charm School	April 15, 2007	July 27, 2009
The Springer Hustle	April 15, 2007	June 5, 2007
Rock of Love with Bret Michaels	July 15, 2007	April 19, 2009
Scott Baio Is 45...and Single	July 15, 2007	August 26, 2007
Mission: Man Band	August 6, 2007	January 1, 2008
The Pickup Artist	August 6, 2007	November 30, 2008
The Rock Life	August 6, 2007	September 3, 2007
What Perez Sez	September 11, 2007	March 18, 2008
America's Most Smartest Model	October 7, 2007	December 16, 2007
The Salt-N-Pepa Show	October 14, 2007	March 24, 2008
Gotti's Way	October 15, 2007	June 22, 2009
The Shot	November 4, 2007	December 23, 2007
Celebrity Rehab with Dr. Drew	January 10, 2008	November 18, 2012
Scott Baio Is 46...and Pregnant	January 13, 2008	March 16, 2008
I Know My Kid's a Star	March 20, 2008	May 8, 2008
¡Viva Hollywood!	April 13, 2008	May 25, 2008
Ego Trip's Miss Rap Supreme	April 14, 2008	June 9, 2008
Celebracadabra	April 27, 2008	June 12, 2008
I Love Money	July 6, 2008	December 1, 2010
Brooke Knows Best	July 13, 2008	August 9, 2009
Old Skool with Terry & Gita	July 13, 2008	August 10, 2008
I Want to Work for Diddy	August 4, 2008	January 4, 2010
Luke's Parental Advisory	August 4, 2008	September 22, 2008
New York Goes to Hollywood	August 4, 2008	September 22, 2008
Glam God with Vivica A. Fox	August 21, 2008	October 16, 2008
The Cho Show	August 21, 2008	September 25, 2008
Real Chance of Love	October 20, 2008	October 26, 2009
Confessions of a Teen Idol	January 4, 2009	February 22, 2009
Tool Academy	January 11, 2009	April 4, 2010
Celebrity Rehab Presents Sober House	January 15, 2009	April 29, 2010
For the Love of Ray J	February 2, 2009	February 8, 2010
Tough Love	March 15, 2009	October 23, 2013
Daisy of Love	April 26, 2009	July 26, 2009
New York Goes to Work	May 4, 2009	June 29, 2009
The T.O. Show	July 20, 2009	October 31, 2011
Megan Wants a Millionaire	August 2, 2009	August 16, 2009
My Antonio	August 16, 2009	October 25, 2009
Eddie Griffin: Going for Broke	September 14, 2009	October 19, 2009
Sex Rehab with Dr. Drew	November 1, 2009	December 20, 2009
Frank the Entertainer in a Basement Affair	January 3, 2010	March 28, 2010
Secrets of Aspen	January 3, 2010	February 21, 2010
Let's Talk About Pep	January 11, 2010	March 1, 2010
Fantasia for Real	January 11, 2010	November 28, 2010
The Price of Beauty	March 15, 2010	May 3, 2010
TRANSform Me	March 15, 2010	May 3, 2010
Basketball Wives	April 11, 2010	July 28, 2025
Brandy & Ray J: A Family Business	April 11, 2010	February 27, 2011
What Chilli Wants	April 11, 2010	February 27, 2011
The OCD Project	May 27, 2010	July 15, 2010
Dad Camp	May 31, 2010	July 28, 2010
Bridal Bootcamp	June 9, 2010	July 21, 2010
You're Cut Off!	June 9, 2010	February 28, 2011
Ochocinco: The Ultimate Catch	July 11, 2010	September 5, 2010
Money Hungry	August 2, 2010	October 4, 2010
Real and Chance: The Legend Hunters	September 19, 2010	November 24, 2010
Bret Michaels: Life as I Know It	October 18, 2010	December 20, 2010
Football Wives	October 24, 2010	December 19, 2010
Dance Cam Slam	October 26, 2010	December 8, 2010
Mario Lopez: Saved by the Baby	November 1, 2010	January 3, 2011
My Big Friggin' Wedding	November 1, 2010	January 3, 2011
The X-Life	January 10, 2011	February 28, 2011
Love & Hip Hop: New York	March 6, 2011	March 9, 2020
Beverly Hills Fabulous	March 14, 2011	May 16, 2011
Wedding Wars	March 14, 2011	May 16, 2011
Audrina	April 17, 2011	June 19, 2011
Mob Wives	April 17, 2011	March 16, 2016
Saddle Ranch	April 17, 2011	July 19, 2011
Famous Food	July 10, 2011	September 7, 2011
Ton of Cash	August 17, 2011	October 26, 2011
La La's Full Court Life	August 22, 2011	July 2, 2014
Basketball Wives LA	August 29, 2011	October 23, 2016
Baseball Wives	November 30, 2011	January 30, 2012
T.I. & Tiny: The Family Hustle	December 5, 2011	May 29, 2017
Mob Wives: The Sit Down	January 29, 2012	March 27, 2012
Couples Therapy	March 21, 2012	December 9, 2015
Love & Hip Hop: Atlanta	June 18, 2012	November 21, 2022
Hollywood Exes	June 27, 2012	July 2, 2014
Big Ang	July 8, 2012	September 2, 2012
Chrissy & Mr. Jones	September 24, 2012	December 16, 2013
Marrying the Game	November 19, 2012	July 2, 2014
Making Mr. Right	January 6, 2013	February 18, 2013
Black Ink Crew	January 7, 2013	July 31, 2023
Wicked Single	March 17, 2013	May 5, 2013
The Gossip Game	April 1, 2013	May 20, 2013
Master of the Mix (Note: Originally aired on Centric)	April 1, 2013	June 3, 2013
Off Pitch	April 17, 2013	May 22, 2013
I'm Married to a...	April 21, 2013	June 25, 2013
Model Employee	May 8, 2013	June 26, 2013
Miami Monkey	September 8, 2013	November 11, 2013
Make or Break: The Linda Perry Project	July 16, 2014	September 3, 2014
Candidly Nicole	July 17, 2014	September 16, 2015
Dating Naked	July 17, 2014	September 14, 2016
LeAnn & Eddie	July 17, 2014	September 4, 2014
Atlanta Exes	August 18, 2014	September 29, 2014
I Heart Nick Carter	September 10, 2014	October 29, 2014
Love & Hip Hop: Hollywood	September 15, 2014	December 23, 2019
Tiny & Shekinah's Weave Trip	October 13, 2014	December 8, 2014
K. Michelle: My Life	November 3, 2014	February 6, 2017
Suave Says	December 3, 2014	February 3, 2015
Bye Felicia!	December 9, 2014	January 27, 2015
Sorority Sisters	December 15, 2014	January 16, 2015
Barely Famous	March 18, 2015	July 27, 2016
Walk of Shame Shuttle	March 18, 2015	June 10, 2015
Hot Grits	March 25, 2015	April 1, 2015
Swab Stories	April 27, 2015	June 17, 2015
She's Got Game	August 10, 2015	October 12, 2015
Black Ink Crew: Chicago	October 26, 2015	October 11, 2022
Stevie J & Joseline: Go Hollywood	January 25, 2016	March 21, 2016
Family Therapy with Dr. Jenn	March 16, 2016	May 18, 2016
America's Next Top Model (Note: Originally aired on UPN, then The CW)	December 12, 2016	April 10, 2018
RuPaul's Drag Race (Note: Originally aired on Logo)	March 24, 2017	April 22, 2022
Scared Famous	October 23, 2017	December 11, 2017
RuPaul's Drag Race All Stars	January 25, 2018	July 24, 2020
RuPaul's Drag Race: Untucked! (Note: Originally aired on Logo, then YouTube)	March 22, 2018	April 8, 2022
Teyana & Iman	March 26, 2018	April 30, 2018
T.I. & Tiny: Friends & Family Hustle	October 22, 2018	June 29, 2020
Cartel Crew	January 7, 2019	August 9, 2021
Girls Cruise	July 15, 2019	September 30, 2019
Love & Listings	July 29, 2019	August 31, 2020
RuPaul's Secret Celebrity Drag Race	April 24, 2020	September 30, 2022
To Catch a Beautician	May 25, 2020	August 24, 2020
RuPaul's Drag Race All Stars: Untucked	June 5, 2020	July 24, 2020
RuPaul's Drag Race: Vegas Revue	August 21, 2020	September 25, 2020
Brunch with Tiffany	September 7, 2020	September 28, 2020
Family Reunion: Love & Hip Hop Edition	February 8, 2021	February 6, 2023
VH1 Couples Retreat	April 19, 2021	June 27, 2022
My Celebrity Dream Wedding	January 3, 2022	2022
Caught in the Act: Unfaithful	July 18, 2022	January 8, 2023
Basketball Wives Orlando	October 9, 2023	January 9, 2024
Celebrity Squares	October 17, 2023	February 13, 2024
Black Ink Crew: Los Angeles	August 14, 2019	July 17, 2023
The Impact: New York	January 22, 2024	March 11, 2024
Love & Hip Hop: Miami (Note: Moved to BET)	January 1, 2018	April 28, 2025

=== Game shows ===
Title	Premiere date	End date
Rumor Has It	June 7, 1993	October 28, 1993
My Generation	1998	1998
Rock & Roll Jeopardy!	August 8, 1998	June 26, 2005
Name That Video	March 12, 2001	May 18, 2001
Cover Wars	June 23, 2001	September 8, 2001
Never Mind the Buzzcocks	March 4, 2002	April 1, 2002
The World Series of Pop Culture	July 10, 2006	July 19, 2007
Hip Hop Squares	March 13, 2017	September 17, 2019

=== Talk show/Variety ===
Title	Premiere date	End date
Stand-Up Spotlight	1988	1991
The RuPaul Show	October 12, 1996	September 23, 1998
The List	November 8, 1999	December 15, 2000
Rotten TV	January 23, 2000	?
Late World with Zach	March 4, 2002	May 2, 2002
The Greatest...	September 23, 2002	March 5, 2014
I Love the '80s	December 16, 2002	December 20, 2002
Red Hot Red Carpet	May 28, 2003	May 23, 2004
I Love the '70s	August 18, 2003	August 22, 2003
I Love the '80s Strikes Back	October 20, 2003	October 24, 2003
Best Week Ever	January 23, 2004	April 23, 2014
Redlight Greenlight	2004	2005
I Love the '90s	July 12, 2004	July 16, 2004
I Love the '90s: Part Deux	January 17, 2005	January 21, 2005
I Love the '80s 3-D	October 23, 2005	October 28, 2005
I Love the Holidays	November 20, 2005	—
Celebrity Eye Candy	December 15, 2005	January 11, 2008
Web Junk 20	January 13, 2006	December 15, 2006
I Love Toys	March 6, 2006	March 10, 2006
I Love the '70s: Volume 2	July 9, 2006	July 14, 2006
I Love the New Millennium	June 23, 2008	June 26, 2008
Black to the Future	February 24, 2009	February 27, 2009
The Great Debate	July 6, 2009	July 10, 2009
Undateable	May 10, 2010	May 14, 2010
The Jenny McCarthy Show	February 8, 2013	May 24, 2013
The Gossip Table	June 3, 2013	June 5, 2015
I Love the 2000s	June 17, 2014	June 21, 2014
The Amber Rose Show	July 8, 2016	September 26, 2016
Martha & Snoop's Potluck Dinner Party	November 7, 2016	February 12, 2020
Grown & Sexy	January 4, 2019	January 11, 2019
Brunch With Tiffany	September 7, 2020	September 28, 2020

=== Scripted programming ===
==== Drama ====
Title	Premiere date	End date
Hit the Floor	May 27, 2013	September 5, 2016
The Breaks	February 20, 2017	April 10, 2017
Scream (Note: Originally aired on MTV)	July 8, 2019	July 10, 2019

==== Comedy ====
Title	Premiere date	End date
Random Play	July 24, 1999	September 17, 1999
Strange Frequency	August 18, 2001	November 11, 2001
Hey Joel	June 3, 2003	June 17, 2003
VH1 ILL-ustrated	October 17, 2003	June 25, 2004
Love Monkey (Note: Originally aired on CBS)	April 18, 2006	May 16, 2006
Acceptable.TV	March 13, 2007	May 11, 2007
I Hate My 30's	July 26, 2007	September 13, 2007
Free Radio	February 3, 2008	March 21, 2009
Single Ladies	May 30, 2011	March 24, 2014
Hindsight	January 7, 2015	March 11, 2015
Daytime Divas	June 5, 2017	July 31, 2017

=== Acquired programming ===
- 48 Hours
- American Bandstand
- Armed & Famous
- Arsenio Jams
- Beauty and the Geek
- Beavis and Butt-Head
- Chappelle's Show
- Cheaters
- The Cher Show
- The Cleveland Show
- Click!
- Don't Forget the Lyrics!
- Entertainment Tonight
- Eve
- Family Matters
- FashionTelevision
- The Fresh Prince of Bel-Air
- Gene Simmons' Rock School
- Girlfriends
- Happy Endings
- Hard Rock Live
- Hip Hop Honors
- The History of Rock 'n' Roll
- In Living Color
- Jackson 5ive
- The Jamie Foxx Show
- John Mayer Has a TV Show
- Key & Peele
- Living Single
- Martin
- Matzo and Metal
- Maxim Hot 100
- Miami Vice
- The Midnight Special
- The Mindy Project
- The Monkees
- Most Awesomely Bad
- My VH1 Music Awards
- The Neighborhood
- New Girl
- New York Undercover
- The Parkers
- Real Husbands of Hollywood
- The Ren & Stimpy Show
- Saturday Night Live
- Saved by the Bell
- Scream Queens
- Sister, Sister
- Solid Gold
- South of Sunset
- Strip Search
- That '70s Show
- This Is Hot 97
- Totally Awesome
- Totally Gay!
- Trapped in the Closet
- TV's Illest Minority Moments
- VH1 Divas
- VH1 Rock Honors
- Vibe Awards
- The Wayans Bros.
- When __ Ruled the World
