= Mind of a Man =

United States television series

- Genre: Game Show
- Created by: Mark Cronin
- Developed by: Mark Cronin
- Directed by: Dennis Rosenbaltt
- Presented by: DeRay Davis
- Starring: Alonzo Bodden; Mo Mandel; Bethany Dwyer
- Composer: Cooper Rich
- Country of origin: United States
- Original language: English
- No. of seasons: 1
- No. of episodes: 40

Production
- Executive producers: Mark Cronin; Courtland Cox; Marilyn Wilson
- Production location: New York City
- Editors: Josh Belson; Pete Hentrich; Steven Simone-friedland; Ray Van Ness III; Kevin Kearney
- Camera setup: Single-camera
- Running time: 21-22 Minutes
- Production company: 51 Minds Entertainment

Original release
- Network: Game Show Network
- Release: January 8 – May 14, 2014

Mind of a Man is a game show broadcast by Game Show Network, with DeRay Davis as host. On each episode, two female contestants attempt to figure out what men believe about marriage, dating, work, and other subjects. Similar to Family Feud, the questions have previously been answered by a survey of one hundred men. Over the course of four rounds, a celebrity panel consisting of two men and a woman helps the contestants by offering their opinions about the correct answers to the surveys. The winner advances to the bonus round, which features a top prize of $10,000.

The series, green-lit on August 16, 2013, began airing on January 8, 2014, and concluded on May 14, 2014. Critical reception for the series was mixed, with one writer calling it "a lot of fun" while another arguing the premise to be "low-minded".

Despite its short run, this was the second game show in history to have two female contestants playing. 31 years ago, The first short-lived, male-oriented game show to have two female contestants playing was Just Men! hosted by Betty White who would later win her daytime emmy for outstanding game show host at the time. Airing in daytime on NBC in 1983.

== Gameplay ==
In the first round, the contestants are asked to predict the most popular answer to each of three questions. Each question has three multiple choice options, and was asked to a group of 100 men. The panel is allowed to offer their opinion on the correct answer while the contestants submit their answers on their tablet computers. Each correct prediction is worth $200.

The second round plays almost exactly the same as the first round; however, the questions were asked to men who belong to a specific group (e.g., married men, African-American men, or men under the age of 25). Each correct prediction is worth $300. The last question of Round 2 is designated as the "VIP" question, which is focused on one specific group of men and asked to a special guest related to the question. When the VIP question is about a specific man, before the question is asked, the panel is allowed 30 seconds to "interrogate" the VIP about their background, personal preferences, etc., and then the question is played out as normal, with the VIP giving his answer verbally after the contestants give their prediction. Actor Ted Lange (most well known for his role on The Love Boat) appeared in some episodes as the show's bartender and was often the man who was previously asked the VIP question.

In the third round (entitled "The Male Order"), each contestant, starting with the current leader (or the winner of a pre-show coin toss, in case of a tie), is given one question, and may choose any panelist to assist them on the question. For the Male Order question, the contestant is asked to rank the three answers from most popular to least popular. Although the panelist will give their opinion as to the correct ranking, the contestant has the final decision. The contestant picks up $100 for one answer correctly ranked, or $500 for all three.

The fourth round is titled the "Men's High Five" and is an open-ended question asked to 200 men. The top five answers are placed on the board in a random order, and the panel again gives their opinion on what would be the most popular answer. If the score going into this question is tied, each contestant is allowed to select one answer, with the winner of the pre-show coin toss deciding who makes the first selection. If one contestant has the lead, that contestant goes first and is given a selection; her opponent is then allowed one provided the first contestant did not pick the most popular answer. If the most popular answer has not yet been revealed, the first contestant is given one more selection. The contestant who selects the highest-ranked answer wins the game, keeps her money, and plays the $10,000 Tag Team Round.

=== $10,000 Tag Team Round ===
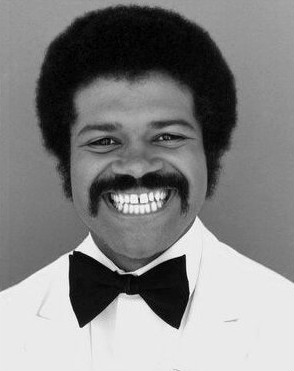
Ted Lange appeared in several episodes of the series during the VIP question.

For this round (entitled the "$10,000 Tag Team Round"), the contestant chooses one panelist to assist her. The host reads a series of pairs of related items, and each member of the team, in turn, tries to determine which answer was more popular. If, between the contestant and the panelist, a total of seven correct answers are given within 30 seconds, the contestant's winnings are increased to $10,000; if not, the contestant wins an additional $300 for every correct answer given.

== Production ==
The series originally appeared during GSN's New York City upfront presentation on April 9, 2013. On August 16, 2013, GSN announced that the network had ordered forty episodes of Mind of a Man, and officially announced Davis as host on September 25, 2013.

The series premiered January 8, 2014. The final episode aired on May 14, 2014, while GSN did not renew the show for a second season, the series was pitched for syndication in the 2015-16 season.

== Reception ==
Mind of a Man garnered mixed reception from critics. Neil Genzlinger of The New York Times argued that the questions were "frivolous" and previewed the series as being "vacuous but often amusing." The Washington Post's Marc Silver called the series "low-minded" and claimed that after watching an episode, his "mind need[ed] to go take a shower." Acting rather neutral, Hank Stuever, also from The Washington Post, argued that the series' title "sound[s] like the premise for an SNL sketch." Carrie Grosvenor of About Entertainment, however, was pleased with the series, calling it "a lot of fun" and deeming Davis a "great host."

=== Ratings ===
The series premiere on January 8, 2014, garnered average ratings, with the premiere episode earning 497,000 total viewers and 112,000 viewers among adults 18 to 49, GSN debuted the series that night with four consecutive episodes, which averaged around 407,000 viewers during the two-hour programming stack.
