= Ocho Cinco (disambiguation) =

Ocho Cinco or Ochocinco ("eight five" in Spanish) is a nickname of American football player Chad Johnson.

It may also refer to:

- Ochocinco: The Ultimate Catch, American reality television series airing on VH1 starring wide receiver Chad Ochocinco (Chad Johnson)
- "Ocho Cinco", track by French Montana featuring Diddy, Red Cafe, MGK and Los from the 2012 mixtape Mac & Cheese 3
- "Ocho Cinco", track by DJ Snake featuring Yellow Claw from the 2016 album Encore
