= Mark Cronin =

American television producer and writer

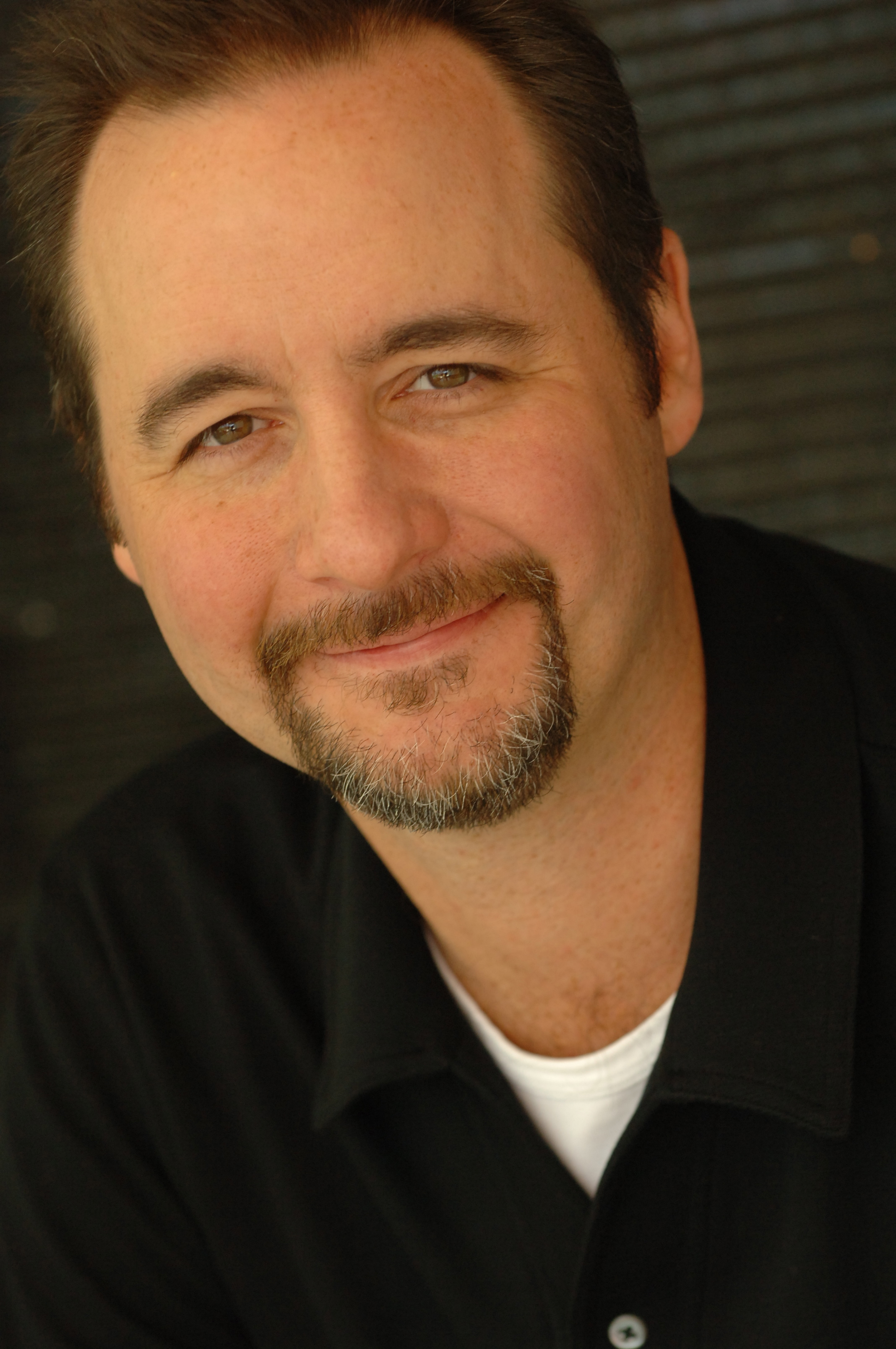
- Occupations: Television producer, writer

Mark Cronin is an American television producer and writer.

== Biography ==
Cronin grew up in the Philadelphia suburb of Upper Darby Township, Pennsylvania. He graduated from Upper Darby High School and the University of Pennsylvania. At the later, he earned a degree in Chemical Engineering and was in the cast of the Mask and Wig Club. He spent five years working as an engineer in research and marketing. His first job in entertainment was moonlighting as a freelance joke writer for an Ace Award-winning news-break spoof on Nick at Nite called Global Village News.

Cronin switched careers permanently when he joined Howard Stern's nationally syndicated Saturday night television show The Howard Stern Show as a staff writer in 1991. His responsibilities expanded to include scripting entire episodes, producing celebrity interviews, and producing comedic field pieces. He went on to contribute to Stern's national radio show and serve as producer/writer on his television and video projects, including Stern's New Year's Rotten Eve pay per view special — the most watched entertainment pay per view event of all time. Cronin also scripted an entire E! Entertainment special for Stern's book, Miss America.

In 1995, he moved to Los Angeles to become head writer for MTV's dating show Singled Out with Chris Hardwick and Jenny McCarthy. He eventually was promoted to show-runner for two seasons. In 1996, he joined the Fox network, supervising production for their first prime-time game show, Big Deal. In 1997, he returned to late night and served as supervising producer for The Keenen Ivory Wayans Show.

In 1997, Cronin founded Mindless Entertainment with then-partner Gary Auerbach, who left the company in 2001. The inspiration for the company name came from Cronin's mother, who called TV "that mindless entertainment".

Mindless' initial production slate included The X Show and The New Movie Show with Chris Gore for FX; Beat the Geeks for Comedy Central; America's Most Talented Kids for PAX; and Cram and Extreme Dodgeball for GSN.

In 2004, Cronin's Mindless Entertainment teamed up with Cris Abrego's 51 Pictures to form 51 Minds Entertainment — the company that produced VH1's initial lineup of reality television. Anchored by the "Celebreality" flagship show The Surreal Life, the company went on to create related shows including Strange Love, with Flavor Flav and Brigitte Nielsen; My Fair Brady with Christopher Knight and Adrianne Curry; The Surreal Life Fame Games; Flavor of Love; I Love New York; and Rock of Love. In 2008, Endemol USA acquired a controlling interest in 51 Minds in a deal reported to be worth upward of $200 million.

In 2013, Cronin created and produced Below Deck for Bravo (which was the channel's highest rated, new show premiere of the year), Ghost Mine for SyFy Channel (which garnered a second season order), Cash Dome Pawn for TruTV, Heroes of Cosplay for SyFy Channel, and Scrubbing In for MTV.

In 2014, Cronin began producing under a new banner, Little Wooden Boat Productions. Under Little Wooden Boat, he became executive producer of Idiotest on Game Show Network. Idiotest premiered its fourth season, Thursday, January 19, 2017.

As of 2024, Below Deck has had continued success with its audience and has completed eleven seasons. Season 4 was one of Bravo's fastest growing series and season 11 just finished a successful run in early 2024.

With Below Deck's popularity, Cronin sold a spin-off show to Bravo called, Below Deck Mediterranean. This series premiered May 3, 2016 and the season's ratings permitted Bravo to renew the show for a second season that premiered in 2017.

== Productions ==
- America's Most Smartest Model
- America's Most Talented Kids
- America's Next Top Zombie Idol
- Beat the Geeks
- Below Deck
- Below Deck Mediterranean
- Brandy and Ray J: A Family Business
- Bret Michaels: Life As I Know It
- Bridalplasty
- Cash Dome Pawn
- Celebrity Paranormal Project
- Charm School
- Cram
- Daisy of Love
- Extreme Dodgeball
- Famous Food
- Flavor of Love
- For the Love of Ray J
- Frank the Entertainer in a Basement Affair
- Ghost Mine Season 1 and 2
- Gotti's Way
- Heroes of Cosplay
- Hurt Bert
- Idiotest
- I Love Money
- I Love New York
- La La's Full Court Life
- La La's Full Court Wedding
- Mario Lopez: Saved By the Baby
- Megan Wants a Millionaire
- Money Hungry
- My Fair Brady
- The New Movie Show with Chris Gore
- New York Goes to Hollywood
- New York Goes to Work
- Ochocinco: The Ultimate Catch
- Real and Chance: The Legend Hunters
- Real Chance of Love
- Rock of Love
- Rock of Love: Charm School
- Strange Love
- The Surreal Life
- The Surreal Life: Fame Games
- Ton of Cash
- Ultimate Film Fanatic
- Ultimate Zoo
- Who Wants to Be Governor of California: The Debating Game
- The X Life
- The X Show
