= Cram (game show) =

American reality TV game show

- Genre: Game show, reality show
- Created by: Mark Cronin; Jonathan Goodson; James Rowley
- Directed by: R. Brian DiPirro
- Presented by: Graham Elwood
- Starring: Berglind Icey; Arturo Gil; Andrea Hutchman
- Country of origin: United States
- No. of seasons: 2
- No. of episodes: 105

Production
- Executive producers: Mark Cronin; Jonathan Goodson; Harris Katleman; James Rowley
- Running time: 22–24 minutes
- Production companies: Mindless Entertainment; Jonathan Goodson Productions; Game Show Network Originals

Original release
- Network: GSN
- Release: January 6 – September 19, 2003

Cram is an American game show which aired on GSN from January 6 to September 19, 2003.

The show featured two teams, each composed of two contestants. For 24 hours before taping, the contestants were sequestered and sleep deprived at a storefront (located at the then-named Hollywood and Highland complex on Hollywood Boulevard, which is now called Ovation Hollywood). Contestants were then escorted to Raleigh Studios, in Los Angeles, California, where the actual gameplay would commence; with the intent of the contestants staying awake, and "cramming" various material such as trivia questions and jokes, which they would then answer on the show while attempting physical stunts in an attempt to stay awake. Graham Elwood was the show's host, with assistance from Berglind Icey (known on the show simply as "Icey"). Also assisting Elwood were Andrea Hutchman as "Miss Pickwick" and Arturo Gil as "Dr. Damnearkilter". (Gil appeared only on episodes where the Riddle Round involved the table of lemon juice shots.)

Teams were recorded with surveillance cameras throughout their cramming session, and humorous clips of them trying to stay awake or acting delirious from lack of sleep would be shown at various times in each episode.

== Format ==
=== The Rant ===
Each team has two members (usually male-female) with a pre-existing relationship. Both teams start with 100 points. In The Rant, each team is required to talk about one of three articles (two in the second season) they had been assigned to read while walking inside a giant hamster wheel.

The team who won a "3 a.m. coin toss" that was done before the taping selected one of the article topics to Rant about, while the other team picked from the remaining choices. (In season two, the second team automatically had to speak on the article the first team didn't choose). Each team in turn had to speak from memory about the information presented in their article continuously for 40 seconds, (with each team member respectively talking for 20 seconds). Producers preselected eight key words or phrases that they believed were the most important elements of the article. (This list is shown to home viewers, but not the contestants.)

If a contestant stops talking, says "um" or "uh," stutters, goes off-topic or repeats previously stated information, the team is buzzed, with five points per violation.

For each key word or phrase mentioned by the team, ten points are added to their score. Both teams had to continually walk inside the wheels during both Rants.

An early episode from the first season saw the Rant work slightly different. Each team member had 30 seconds to talk continuously about the article (60 seconds total); with ten hidden key words or phrases selected from the article. 1 point was added per second for Ranting up to 60, while the points added for saying a keyword or deducted for committing a violation remained the same, with Elwood holding a handheld buzzer to use when a contestant committed said violation.

=== Stunt round ===
For round two, each team (starting with the team in the lead or the winners of the 3 a.m. coin toss in case of a tie) performs a stunt and simultaneously answers a list of questions for 40 seconds (45 seconds in the first season). The first team is allowed to choose one of two stunts. The round tests the teams' ability to multitask after being deprived of sleep. Stunts take various forms, such as demonstrating yoga positions, matching cuts of meat to a picture of a cow, or even firing hard candies at small chocolate bunnies using a slingshot. All aspects of the stunts are things that the contestants had been given to study overnight. Every stunt has seven physical items, tasks, or activities the teams were asked to do. Players had to alternate the physical activities.

At the same time, players would alternate answering up to 12 verbal questions from Elwood, typically from the program's own compendium of absurd trivia called "Cram's Big Dumb Book of Stupid Lists," which contestants had also been instructed to study.

Each successful part of the stunt earns 20 points for the team, while correctly answered questions each earn 10 points. The other team would automatically perform the second activity under the same scoring rules.

A maximum of 260 points could be earned by a team in the stunt round. The team not participating in the stunt had to continue walking inside their hamster wheel.

=== Riddle round ===
Starting with the trailing team, one partner participates in a physical activity, ranging from powering a mechanism to a set level or speed, or eating something. The question answering partner, had 40 seconds (45 seconds in the first season) to answer inane trivia questions, which the players were told to study prior, (varying from riddles, puns, jokes, compound words, or alternative media franchise titles) posed by Elwood, each worth 30 points. Before he/she could answer, however, the activity partner had to reach and maintain the required threshold. Every passed or missed question given by the question answering partner, increased the difficulty the minimum threshold to be able to answer future questions.

If the round involved a table of lemon juice shots that the activity partner had to drink, an evil dwarf named "Dr. Damnearkilter" (Arturo Gil) appeared to constantly heckle the activity partner by whipping the table and shouting stuff like "DRINK IT!", "DRINK IT DOWN!", "SCHNELL! SCHNELL!!" and "PURE ACID!" into the activity partner's face.

At the end of this round, the higher-scoring team won $1,000 and advanced to the bonus round, while their opponents won $500. If the game ended in a tie, a question with a numerical answer was asked; both teams wrote down a guess, and the team that came closest was the winner. Each team's winnings were split evenly between the two partners.

=== $10,000 quiz ===
For the $10,000 quiz bonus round, immediately after the stunt round, the winning team climbs into a pair of twin beds onstage and dons blindfolds while the lights are dimmed. "Miss Pickwick," the "resident sleep therapist" (Andrea Hutchman), reads the team a series of bizarre facts, historical events, and other strange pieces of trivia over the course of the final commercial break. In addition to the facts, contestants are also read various suggestions such as "You're getting so sleepy" to make staying awake even more difficult.

After Elwood quietly explains the rules to the TV audience, the studio lights are turned on in time with a loud alarm, often accompanied by Icey making a loud noise. A 60-second countdown immediately starts, and the team has to get out of bed and run across the stage to Elwood, balancing on an unstable or uncomfortable object. Elwood would ask questions that came solely from Miss Pickwick's information. However, before the team can answer a question, they have to get all four feet off the ground and onto the object (such as a small flat raised circle stump on the ground, a balance beam, a rolling log, a high wire, two surfboards or two raised balance levers) that was located in the center of the stage. Every time a part of anyone's body touches the ground, a buzzer sounds and Elwood stops reading and restarts the question when the players recovers. (Players can respond and answer immediately, at any time their feet were off the ground, without waiting for him to finish the question.) The contestants starts at the bottom (Level 0) of a ladder and must answer enough questions to reach the top (Level 5). Each right answer moves the team up a level, while giving an incorrect answer or passing moves them down a level. The team cannot go below Level 0.

If the team reaches Level 5 before time runs out, they split $10,000; if not, they split an additional $100 for each level they reach. Cram souvenir coffee mugs were given to $10,000 winners in the first season, and to all winning teams in the second season.

== April Fools' Day episode ==
The 2003 April Fools' Day episode, as part of GSN's April Fools prank where hosts swap places, in which the original hosts appear as cameos, and play as contestants in Lingo for charity, was hosted by Marc Summers, the host of WinTuition, and featured Elwood in drag as Miss Pickwick. Elwood was also featured in the POV video during round 3, appearing to be running from a vehicle trying to run him down.

== Broadcast history ==
GSN would air Cram in first run on Sunday nights, with reruns being shown sporadically through the network's time slot. The show vanished off airplay for quite some time. As of 2020, Pluto TV has episodes of the show available for streaming.
