= Ben Gleib =

American actor and comedian

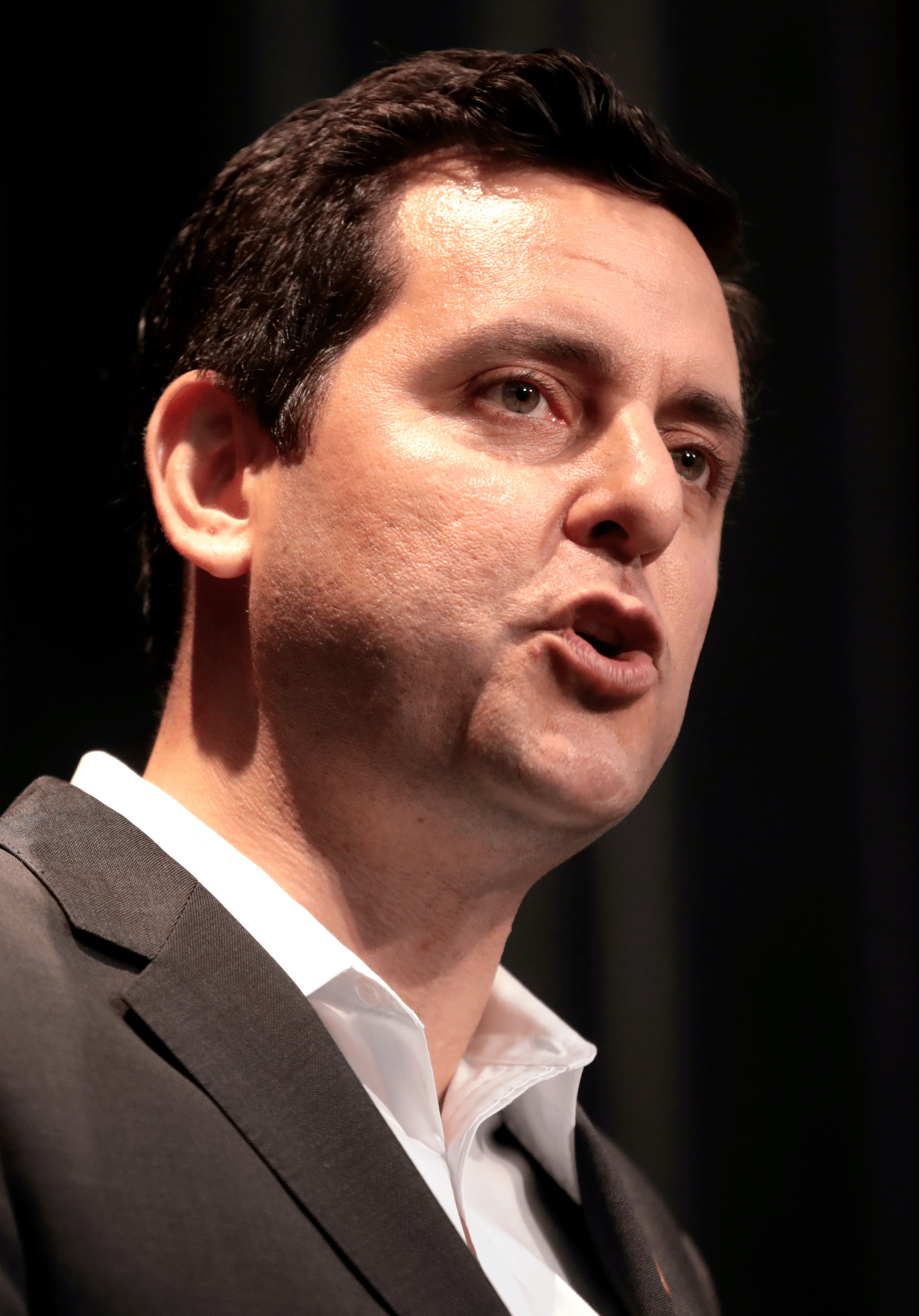
- Gleib in 2019
- Born: Benjamin Nathan Gleiberman; June 18, 1978 (age 48); Los Angeles, California, U.S.
- Education: University California San Diego (B.A., 2000, Communications and Theatre)
- Occupations: Standup comedy, acting, television personality, game show host
- Political party: Democratic

Benjamin Nathan Gleiberman (born June 18, 1978) is an American actor, stand-up comedian, satirist, news commentator, and writer.

== Early life and education ==
Gleib was born Ben Nathan Gleiberman to Nate and Ziva Gleiberman in Los Angeles, California, on June 18, 1978. He has a younger brother named Ron Gleiberman.

Gleib attended the University of California, San Diego, where he studied communications and theater. His honors thesis work included producing a four-year campus TV talk show, The Gleib Show, the finale of which included Gleib's delivery to UC San Diego's Price Center Plaza by marines in a military tank, followed by an interview with Carmen Electra.

== Career ==
In 2006, Gleib sold a television pilot, The Gleib Show, to Fox. The pilot was produced by Saturday Night Live creator Lorne Michaels, Broadway Video, and NBC/Universal. It was based on a TV show that Gleib directed, wrote, and starred in for three seasons on the National Lampoon College Network from 2003 to 2005 that aired to college campuses across the country; it was consistently the network's number one show. It was co-written and produced by Scot Richardson. The series was based on a show of the same title that Gleib had performed for four years while he attended college at the University of California, San Diego.

In 2007, Gleib starred in the NBC series The Real Wedding Crashers, a primetime comedy. The show also aired on Bravo and the Style Network. Other cast members included Desi Lydic (host of The Daily Show), Catherine Reitman (creator, executive producer, writer, and star of Workin' Moms), Gareth Reynolds (co-host of The Dollop), and Steve Byrne (creator, writer, and star of Sullivan & Son).

Gleib was billed as one of "the six comedians who could be comedy's next big things" and part of "a bumper crop of brilliant new-alt comics" by Esquire. He was also named one of the "funniest comedians working today" by TBS. In 2008, Gleib was featured on the NBC competition show Last Comic Standing. He subsequently performed stand-up twice on NBC's Last Call with Carson Daly in 2009 and 2015. He is known for covering a wide range of topics in his act as well as his improvisational skills, often making up large sections of his performance based on interactions with the crowd.

Gleib was a regular guest on the E! late night talk show Chelsea Lately for seven years until the show ended in 2014. He has been a frequent guest on KPCC (Southern California's NPR affiliate) on the Patt Morrison Program, bringing his comedic spin to political issues. Gleib won a Golden Mic aware for his work on Patt Morrison's Comedy Congress. He also reported for KPCC live from the 2008 Republican National Convention in Saint Paul, Minnesota and the 2012 Democratic National Convention in Charlotte, North Carolina.

Gleib has appeared as an actor in thirteen movies, as well as several TV series. His first notable role was a supporting role in the feature film Bar Starz (2008), which had a limited theatrical release. The film also featured Charlie Murphy, Daniel Franceze, Derek Waters, Jon Bernthal, and Nikki Griffin. Gleib is billed in the main cast of Jay and Silent Bob Reboot. Gleib was a lead actor in the Disney+ anthology series Just Beyond based on a graphic novel from R.L. Stine, and he is featured on the series poster. As himself, Gleib was also a regular on Today with Kathie Lee Gifford and Hoda Kotb on NBC. Gleib is also the voice of Marshall the Sloth in Ice Age: Continental Drift (2012), one of the stars of Kevin Smith's Jay & Silent Bob's Super Groovy Cartoon Movie! (2013), and the voice of Dali in The Book of Life (2014). His voices have also appeared in Phineas and Ferb. Including appearances as himself as a host (for example, on Idiotest), panelist, or correspondent, Gleib has appeared on over 400 episodes of television.

In addition, Gleib performed multiple times on The Late Late Show on CBS and on @midnight on Comedy Central. Gleib has also performed at Just for Laughs in Montreal, the Vancouver Comedy Festival, and the Laughing Matters Festival in the Netherlands. He also hosted several podcasts for Current TV and wrote for the Radio Music Awards for ABC in 2002.

Since November 2011, Gleib has hosted the podcast Last Week on Earth with Ben Gleib, distributed through Kevin Smith's SModcast Podcast Network.

Beginning in August 2014, Gleib hosted four seasons (212 episodes) of the television game show Idiotest on the Game Show Network. He also served as head writer and co-executive producer for a portion of the show. It was a top original program on the network, before moving to NETFLIX where it was only the second game show ever on the platform, following Jeopardy! In the Emmy-nominated show, two teams of two contestants face off in increasingly challenging visual brain puzzles for a chance to win up to $10,000. In one memorable episode, all four contestants were Gleib’s real life ex-girlfriends.

Gleib was guest co-anchor for a week for ABC News digital, from ABC News world headquarters in New York, and provided election night coverage for them in 2016. He has been a frequent on-air contributor on CNN, The Young Turks, and NPR, winning a Golden Mic Award for his work on Southern California NPR's Patt Morrison's Comedy Congress. In 2017, he was one of the hosts of the social impact news show ASPIREist on CNN's Headline News.

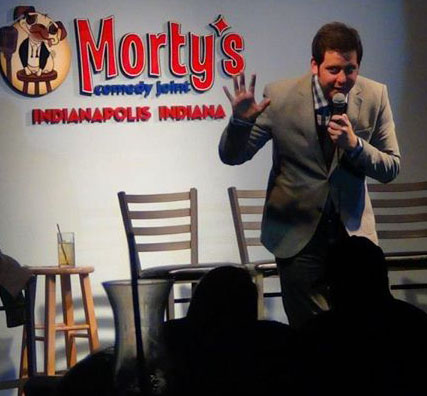
Gleib at Morty's Comedy Joint in Indianapolis, Indiana in 2013

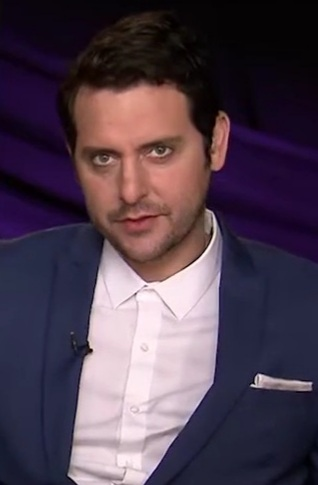
Gleib in 2017

His hour-long stand-up special Ben Gleib: Neurotic Gangster debuted on Showtime in 2016 and has been available on Amazon Prime. His follow up special, Ben Gleib: The Mad King, was produced by Helium Comedy Studios and released on their YouTube channel. Kelly Carlin, who later produced Gleib's third special Endings, noted that Gleib's second special "reminds me of elements of my dad’s approach." Gleib filmed his third special Endings in September 2024, which is about the most challenging year of his life. In additional to being executive produced by Kelly Carlin, Endings was directed by Christian Lamb.

In October 2021, Charlie Kirk invited Gleib on his show for a debate about abortion. Gleib showed Kirk a photograph of a fetus and asked him if it was a human being, to which Kirk replied, "without a doubt", before Gleib revealed that it was actually that of a dolphin. Gleib's debate with Kirk, particularly the moment with the dolphin fetus, was covered by Sam Seder on The Majority Report, as well as on The Young Turks.

Since 2022, Gleib has co-hosted episodes of The Young Turks. On December 2, 2022, Gleib, who is of Jewish heritage, made an appearance on The Young Turks criticizing Kanye West for an interview he had done with InfoWars, wherein West praised Adolf Hitler and the Nazis and denied the Holocaust.

== Telethon for America ==
In 2018, Gleib created (and executed produced) the Telethon for America in partnership with Michelle Obama’s When We All Vote organization. Olivia Munn co-hosted with Gleib. Participating celebrities included Amy Schumer, Jane Fonda, Charlize Theron, Julia Louis-Dreyfus, Judd Apatow, Chelsea Handler, Alyssa Milano, Natalie Portman, Pete Davidson, and Jessica Alba.

Gleib again produced (with Milano and Rosario Dawson) and hosted (with Dawson) the Telethon for America in 2020 in partnership with Represent Us.

== 2020 United States presidential campaign ==
On May 13, 2019, Gleib announced his candidacy for President of the United States on Twitter. Shortly thereafter, Cenk Uygur of The Young Turks interviewed Gleib. He was also interviewed by Larry King on Politicking with Larry King, by Hannah Jewell of The Washington Post, by Stuart Varney on FOX Business Network, by Tomi Lahren on Fox Nation, and on NowThis.

Gleib campaigned over the course of seven months in thirteen states and territories. On August 21, 2019, at the annual AFL-CIO convention at Prairie Meadows Hotel in Altoona, he was the final speaker out of all 2020 Democratic candidates who spoke. However, Gleib was unable to garner significant mainstream media attention or financing, raising less than $70,000 through all of 2019. Despite media and financial struggles, Gleib's campaign finished as the 29th highest fundraising Democratic campaign out of over 200 campaigns. Additionally, his campaign's online donations were exclusively from first-time donors and represented all 50 U.S. states.

Gleib was on the ballot for the New Hampshire primary. On December 30, 2019, Gleib ended his campaign.

== Nowhere Comedy Club ==
In response to the COVID-19 pandemic that left many comedians out of work, Gleib started the world's first entirely digital comedy club, Nowhere Comedy Club, with fellow comedian Steve Hofstetter as co-founder. Unlike other virtual venues, Nowhere encouraged audiences to keep their video and audio active during Zoom sessions so that performers could see and hear the audience's laughter. As a result, Nowhere Comedy Club mimicked being at a live venue in-person.

Within a few months, Nowhere had sold over 10,000 tickets to livestreamed comedy events. Comedians including Sarah Silverman, Bill Burr, Mike Birbiglia, John Cleese, Nikki Glaser, Christian Finnegan, Natasha Leggero, Todd Barry, Judah Friedlander, Jackie Fabulous, Sean Patton, Jay Jurden, Josh Johnson, and the Sklar brothers have all performed at Nowhere. Nowhere was covered in multiple profiles in The New York Times, as well as Fast Company. The interrobang also named Nowhere as the #3 innovator that changed comedy in 2020.
