= Bridalplasty =

American reality television show

- Genre: Reality TV
- Presented by: Shanna Moakler
- Country of origin: United States
- Original language: English
- No. of seasons: 1
- No. of episodes: 10

Production
- Executive producers: Mark Cronin; Giuliana Rancic; Cris Abrego
- Production companies: 51 Minds Entertainment; You & I Productions

Original release
- Network: E!
- Release: November 28, 2010 – January 30, 2011

Bridalplasty is an American reality television series which premiered on the E! network, on November 28, 2010. The show features 12 women who compete to win a wedding and transformative plastic surgery procedures. The series concluded on January 30, 2011, after one season.

== Premise ==
The show followed 12 engaged or already married women competing for the wedding of their dreams and their dream plastic surgery procedure. Each woman had a plastic surgery wishlist, and the winner of each week's wedding-themed challenge would win one plastic surgery procedure from her list.

The winner of the competition received the wedding of her dreams, and had her entire wishlist fulfilled. The husband-to-be did not see his fiancée until she revealed her new look on their wedding day. Shanna Moakler hosted, and Dr. Terry Dubrow performed the plastic surgery procedures.

== Viewership and reception ==
The premise was widely criticized for its embrace of cosmetic surgery and "pushing the limits of medical ethics", as the American Society of Plastic Surgeons prohibits surgeons from performing procedures as the prize for a contest. Jezebel described the show as an "unhealthy" and "dangerous" self-parody of reality TV.

The season premiere was watched by 900,000 viewers; as the season progressed, this sank to 600,000 viewers, a figure described as "dismal".

== Contestants ==
Name	Age	Hometown	Eliminated
Allyson Donovan	32	Crestwood, Illinois	Winner
Jenessa Wainwright	27	Wayne, New Jersey	Runner-Up
Dominique Santoro	24	Surfside, Florida	Episode 9
Cheyenne Aikens	21	Hamburg, New Jersey	Episode 9
Kristen Sciacca	21	Orange County, California	Episode 8
Lisa Marie Naegle †	29	San Pedro, California	Episode 7
Netty Aranguren	23	Glendale, California	Episode 6
Alexandra White	21	Atlanta, Georgia	Episode 5
Melissa Hooper	20	Riverside, California	Episode 4
Jaimie Farnsworth	23	Canoga Park, California	Episode 3
Jessica Slocum	30	Virginia Beach, Virginia	Episode 2
Ashley Langford	25	La Palma, California	Episode 1

† Indicates that the contestant died after filming ended

== Elimination and voting chart ==
Below show the list of brides and their statuses in the competition.

#	Contestants	Episodes									
#	Contestants	1^{1}	2	3	4	5	6	7	8	9^{4}	Finale
1	Allyson	Alexandra	RISK	Alexandra	Lisa Marie	TOP	Lisa Marie	Kristen	TOP	Jenessa^{5}	WINNER
2	Jenessa	Ashley	Lisa Marie	Dominique	Melissa	Kristen	Lisa Marie^{3}	Kristen	Cheyenne	RISK	CUT
3	Dominique	Alexandra	Lisa Marie	RISK	TOP	Netty	Lisa Marie	TOP	Cheyenne	CUT	Jenessa
4	Cheyenne	Alexandra	TOP	Alexandra	Netty	Netty	Netty	Kristen	RISK	CUT	Allyson
5	Kristen	Alexandra^{2}	Allyson	TOP	Lisa Marie	RISK	Netty	RISK	CUT		Allyson
6	Lisa Marie	Ashley	RISK	Dominique	RISK	Netty	RISK	CUT			N/A^{6}
7	Netty	Alexandra	Jessica	Alexandra	RISK	RISK	CUT				Allyson
8	Alexandra	RISK	Allyson	RISK	Netty	CUT					Allyson
9	Melissa	Ashley	Lisa Marie	Dominique	CUT						Jenessa
10	Jaimie	Alexandra	Allyson	CUT							
11	Jessica	Alexandra	CUT								
12	Ashley	CUT									
VOTE TO STAY		7-3	3-3-1	3-3-0	2-2-1	3-1-0	3-2	3-0	2-0	1-0	4-2^{6}

^1 The first elimination between Alexandra and Ashley was decided by a simple hand raise vote from the other brides. From Episode 2 and on, the voting would be held at the RSVP Ceremony.

^2 Kristen was the first bride to finish the challenge, but did not receive any surgeries on her Wish List as all the brides who completed the challenge received botox.

^3 Jenessa was the top bride in episode six. Since there was a tie between Netty and Lisa Marie, Jenessa had to vote in this episode's ceremony. She ended up voting for Lisa Marie to stay.

^4Cheyenne, Dominique, and Jenessa competed in a quiz challenge where one of them would automatically be eliminated, which Cheyenne in the end lost.

^5 Since Allyson was the previous Top Bride, she got to make the decision at the RSVP Ceremony of whom to compete next to in the finale. Allyson chose Jenessa to compete against her.

^6 Lisa Marie's vote at the Final RSVP Ceremony was not revealed due to Allyson already receiving the number of votes to win.

The bride who won Bridalplasty.
The bride was the top bride after finishing the challenge first.
The bride was safe from elimination, and had to vote to save one of the bottom brides.
The bride was part of the bottom, and was at risk of being eliminated.
The bride was cut from the competition after having the fewest votes to stay.
The bride lost the challenge and was immediately cut from the competition.

== Episodes ==
No.	Title	Top bride (prize)	Bottom brides	Cut
1	"Falling to Pieces"	Kristen^{2}	Alexandra and Ashley	Ashley
Twelve brides move into a mansion in a battle for plastic surgery procedures as well as a celebrity-style dream wedding.
2	"For Better or Worse"	Cheyenne (rhinoplasty)	Allyson, Jessica, and Lisa Marie	Jessica
The bride's compatibility with their fiancés is put to the test in an emotional battle for the first plastic surgery procedure.
3	"Unveiled"	Kristen (breast implants)	Alexandra, Dominique, and Jaimie	Jaimie
The ten remaining brides clash in a fight to score the ultimate wedding dress but find out that they have to rely on each other to win this week's surgery.
4	"The Finer Choice"	Dominique (rhinoplasty)	Lisa Marie, Melissa, and Netty	Melissa
The girl's tastes for the finer things are put to the test in a challenge of extremes. A lifelong dream comes true for the plastic surgery winner.
5	"Sporting of a Sparrow"	Allyson (liposuction on her arms and chin)	Alexandra, Kristen, and Netty	Alexandra
With just eight contestants left, the brides are tested on their bedroom knowledge and find themselves in difficult positions battling for this week's surgery.
6	"Flower Power"	Jenessa (rhinoplasty)	Lisa Marie and Netty	Netty
While a challenge to design a piece of their perfect day motivates most of the brides to fight even harder to stay, one bride seems to be falling behind.
7	"Mother-in-Lord-Help-Us"	Dominique (tooth veneers)	Lisa Marie and Kristen	Lisa Marie
Unexpected guests show up to compete with the remaining brides in the challenge that shocks everyone.
8	"A Lie Is a Lie Is a Lie"	Allyson (tooth veneers)	Cheyenne and Kristen	Kristen
Unexpected guests show up and the remaining brides take a lie detector test.
9	"Keep Your Friends Close"	Allyson	Dominique and Jenessa	Cheyenne and Dominique
With only four brides left, the stakes have never been higher. In a surprise challenge, one contestant, Cheyenne, is eliminated right on the spot.
10	"The Perfect Bride"	Allyson	N/A	Jenessa
The first season concludes with the two final brides competing and the winner being revealed. The winning woman is then followed during her final plastic surgeries and wedding preparations. Bridal panel: Dominique, Cheyenne, Kristen, Lisa Marie, Netty, Alexandra, and Melissa.
