= The New Movie Show with Chris Gore =

Television series

- Genre: Talk show
- Created by: Mark Cronin
- Starring: Chris Gore
- Country of origin: United States
- Original language: English

Production
- Running time: 30 minutes
- Production company: FX

Original release
- Release: 2000

The New Movie Show with Chris Gore is a movie review television program hosted by Chris Gore on FX in which a panel of critics shared opinions of newly released films.

The show was short-lived, only airing for a brief period in the spring/summer of 2000. In addition to the panel of critics giving their opinions on newly released films, there were other segments which helped to set the show apart from other similar shows of the day (predictions for the biggest movies of the summer, the panel describing their favorite sequels, awards for the best elements of the James Bond series, etc.).

A memorable early promotional commercial for the show featured Gore giving witty, one-sentence "joke" statements about some recent films. An example of this was Gore describing Eye of the Beholder with the sentence "...at least Ashley Judd got naked."
