= Ton of Cash =

- Genre: Reality television
- Created by: Cris Abrego; Mark Cronin
- Presented by: Dhani Jones
- Country of origin: United States
- Original language: English
- No. of seasons: 1
- No. of episodes: 10

Production
- Production company: 51 Minds Entertainment

Original release
- Network: VH1
- Release: August 17 – October 26, 2011

Ton of Cash is a reality competition that premiered on VH1 on August 17, 2011. Hosted by Dhani Jones, the show centers on a group of contestants trying to win up to $1 million in cash by hauling it along a series of challenge courses ranging from Los Angeles to Las Vegas. It premiered on prime time but was moved to Thursday mornings at 2AM Eastern time slot after the premiere due to low ratings.

== Format ==
Fourteen contestants, all in serious financial trouble, initially gathered on a beach in Malibu, California and were presented with $1 million in prop $1 bills. The money was bundled into 167 bricks weighing 12 pounds each, for a total weight of 2,004 pounds.

On each episode, the host challenged the team to carry the money along a specified route over rugged terrain and deliver as much of it as possible to a marked goal area ("cash point") within a time limit. The team chose one member to serve as a captain ("financial advisor") for the day. At any time, the financial advisor could press a button at the cash point to end the challenge; upon doing so, however, any money that had not yet been delivered was forfeited and deducted from the $1 million prize.

If the financial advisor pressed the button before time ran out, they were safe for the day and could nominate three teammates for elimination. if time ran out, the team began to lose money at a rate of $1,000 per minute for the first half-hour, $5,000 per minute for the second, and $50,000 per minute thereafter. The financial advisor still had to press the button in order to end the challenge, forfeiting any undelivered money; they became eligible for elimination and had to nominate two other contestants as well.

The team and the remaining money were transported by bus overnight, bringing them closer to Las Vegas and their final goal. The next morning, all contestants who were not up for elimination (with the exception of the financial advisor, when applicable) each cast one vote for the candidate they wanted to keep in the game. The one with the most votes received immunity and the title of "Safe Investment," while a "Prove Your Worth" challenge was held between the other two. The loser of this challenge was eliminated with no winnings, but viewers could participate in a text-message poll at the end of the episode to decide if that contestant should receive a consolation prize of $1,000. Surviving candidates for elimination in any given episode could not be chosen as the financial advisor for the next one.

The second half of the season introduced rule modifications as follows.

- Episode 6: For the duration of this episode only, the remaining nine contestants divided themselves into three teams of three each and no financial advisor was chosen. The remaining money was split evenly among the teams, who had to move it to the cash point as quickly as possible with no time limit and no money lost for the day. All three members of the last-place team became eligible for elimination; the one who received the most votes from the other six was out. The host then offered to add $100,000 to the prize fund in exchange for eliminating one of the other two candidates in a "Prove Your Worth" challenge; the offer was accepted.
- Episode 7: The day's financial advisor decided how many bundles of money each person would be responsible for transporting. Any bundle touched or moved by a person not assigned to it was forfeited.
- Episode 8: No contestant was eliminated due to the "Prove Your Worth" challenge ending in a draw.
- Episode 9: All three elimination candidates went to a "Prove Your Worth" challenge, trying to shoot out targets corresponding to the other three contestants. The last contestant with any targets still standing chose one candidate to stay in the game.
- Episode 10: The prize money was rounded up to the next higher multiple of $10,000. The remaining four contestants each had a cash point marked with their own picture, and could place money on any of them. Once all the bundles were delivered, the one with the least money at their position was eliminated. For the final challenge, the three surviving contestants searched the Hard Rock Hotel and Casino on the Las Vegas Strip, trying to be the first to find at least $150,000 worth of bundles tagged in their assigned colors and hit a button at the starting line. One extra bundle, worth $50,000 and colored gold, was also hidden in the hotel.

The winner of the final challenge in Episode 10 won all the cash they found, up to a maximum of $210,000 - the amount that remained of the original $1 million.

== Episodes ==
Cast

Episode	U.S. Air Date	Viewers
"Ton of Cash"	August 17, 2011	312,000
"Under the Bus"	August 24, 2011	201,000
"Queen for a Day"	August 30, 2011	267,000
"If Lakes Could Kill"	September 7, 2011	208,000
"Frozen ASSets"	September 14, 2011	171,000
"When the Trailer's Rockin' Don't Come Knockin"	September 21, 2011	N/A
"Cash of the Titans"	September 28, 2011	N/A
"Impending Dune"	October 12, 2011	321,000
"Zippity-Dough-Dah"	October 19, 2011	N/A
"Stuck Between a Place and a Hard Rock"	October 26, 2011	N/A

- Episodes 1-4: Wednesdays at 9:00EST
- Episodes 5-7: Wednesdays at 11:00EST
- Episodes 8-10: Thursdays at 2:00AM EST

== Episode Progress ==
Rank	Contestants	1	2	3	4	5	6	7	8	9	10 (1st half)	10 (2nd half)
1	Amie	SAFE	SAFE	SAFE	NOM	SAFE	SAFE	SAFE	NOM	BTM 3	SAFE	WINNER
2	Rusty	SAFE	SAFE	SAFE	SAFE	SAFE	SAFE	SAFE	SAFE	SAFE	SAFE	OUT
3	Justin	SAFE	BTM 2	SAFE	SAFE	SAFE	SAFE	SAFE	SAFE	SAFE	SAFE	OUT
4	Vanessa	SAFE	SAFE	NOM	SAFE	NOM	BTM 3	SAFE	BTM 2	SAFE	OUT	
5	James	SAFE	SAFE	SAFE	SAFE	SAFE	SAFE	BTM 2	SAFE	OUT		
6	Temica	SAFE	SAFE	SAFE	SAFE	SAFE	SAFE	NOM	BTM 2	OUT		
7	Chuck	NOM	NOM	BTM 2	BTM 2	SAFE	SAFE	OUT				
8	Ashley	SAFE	SAFE	SAFE	SAFE	SAFE	OUT					
9	Willy Gilley	SAFE	SAFE	SAFE	SAFE	BTM 2	OUT					
10	Ava	SAFE	SAFE	SAFE	SAFE	OUT						
11	Jonny	SAFE	SAFE	SAFE	OUT							
12	Violet	SAFE	SAFE	OUT								
13	Jaime	BTM 2	OUT									
14	Desean	OUT										

(WINNER) The contestant won Ton of Cash.
(SAFE) The contestant was not up for elimination.
(SAFE) The contestant was the Financial Advisor and saved themselves from elimination or got all the money on time.
(NOM) The contestant was the Financial Advisor, was automatically nominated for elimination, and was chosen as the Safe Investment.
(NOM) The contestant was nominated for the elimination by the Financial Advisor but was chosen as the Safe Investment.
(BTM 2/3) The contestant was nominated for elimination by the Financial Advisor, but won the Prove Your Worth challenge.
(OUT) The contestant was nominated for elimination by the Financial Advisor, and lost the Prove Your Worth challenge.
The contestant was a member of the Black Team in the Episode 6 challenge.
The contestant was a member of the Red Team in the Episode 6 challenge.
The contestant was a member of the Blue Team in the Episode 6 challenge.

== Reception ==
Elka Karl from Common Sense Media gave the show a 1 out of 5 stars.

== Trivia ==
In 2012, contestant Vanessa appeared as a contestant on episodes of Fox's Take Me Out, a dating television show.
