= The Surreal Life =

Television series

- Former logo
- Created by: Cris Abrego; Mark Cronin; Rick Telles
- Country of origin: United States
- Original language: English
- No. of seasons: 8
- No. of episodes: 73

Production
- Executive producers: Cris Abrego; Mark Cronin
- Production companies: 51 Minds Entertainment (Note: Known as Mindless Entertainment for season 1); Brass Ring Productions; Go Sick Productions; Renegade 83 Productions; MTV Entertainment Studios

Original release
- Network: The WB
- Release: January 9, 2003 – February 22, 2004
- Network: VH1
- Release: September 5, 2004 – November 21, 2022
- Network: MTV
- Release: July 23 – September 3, 2024

Related
- The Surreal Life: Fame Games; Strange Love; My Fair Brady

The Surreal Life is an American reality television series that records a group of celebrities as they live together for a limited number of weeks. Initial seasons took place in Glen Campbell's former mansion in the Hollywood Hills for two weeks. The format of the show resembles that of The Real World in that the cameras not only record the castmates' participation in group activities assigned to them, but also their interpersonal relationships and conflicts. The show's first two seasons aired on The WB, and subsequent seasons were shown on VH1.

On September 13, 2023, it was reported that the series would move to MTV for its eighth season. The season, titled Villa of Secrets, premiered on July 23, 2024.

== Production history ==
The Surreal Life creators, Cris Abrego, Mark Cronin, and Rick Telles, met with their agents (Chris Coelen and Sara Chazen at UTA) who pitched the idea to them as a possible reality show concept and suggested the title "Surreal World" (after MTV's The Real World). The name was later changed to Surreal Life to avoid legal issues.

== Casting ==
=== Season 1 ===
The first season of The Surreal Life began airing on January 9, 2003, and starred Gabrielle Carteris, MC Hammer, Corey Feldman, Emmanuel Lewis, Jerri Manthey, Vince Neil, and Brande Roderick. Throughout the two-week production, the cast participated in a Survivor-inspired camping trip and a trip to Las Vegas, culminating in the marriage of Corey Feldman, a drama creator in the season, to his girlfriend in the season finale.

=== Season 2 ===
The second season of The Surreal Life began airing on January 11, 2004, and starred Traci Bingham, Trishelle Cannatella, Erik Estrada, Tammy Faye Messner, Ron Jeremy, and Vanilla Ice. Some episode plots involved Ron Jeremy's topless porn-star pool party and Tammy Faye's book signing with members of the gay and transgender community. In one episode, the cast works at a local retro diner under the management of Gary Coleman. Vanilla Ice hoists Coleman above the deep fryer, and insists on having the former child star say his catchphrase, "What'chu talkin' 'bout, Willis?" in public after Coleman's Strokes co-star Todd Bridges shows up. These acts led the former sitcom star to "fire" Ice and then quit. The season also introduced "Dirty Laundry," The Surreal Life talk show hosted by Sally Jessy Raphael. Raphael focused on Cannatella, making several unflattering remarks about her drinking problem, including that she acted "like a slut." Other moments included a surprise stop at the Desert Shadows Inn, a nudist resort (from which Tammy Faye fled in tears), and the production of a children's play.

=== Season 3 ===
The third season of The Surreal Life began airing on September 5, 2004, and starred Charo, Dave Coulier, Flavor Flav, Jordan Knight, Brigitte Nielsen, and Ryan Starr. Memorable moments included Date Night, an agonizing recording session for the group to produce an original song, and Flavor's insistence that he drive the group's RV despite not having a license. Flavor also caused a brief disconnection with the cast, when it was revealed during "Dirty Laundry" that he had hit The Surreal Life puppy. The Surreal Life puppy lived in Long Beach, California after being given to friends of Dave Coulier after the show. The puppy was named Winger after the Detroit Red Wings. Throughout the two weeks, Nielsen and Flav began a relationship which would have a dramatic influence on VH1's programming over the next five years, as it indirectly spawned 14 spinoffs and sequels to date. The romance first continued in Strange Love and snowballed from there, after the success of the Flavor of Love series.

=== Season 4 ===
The fourth season of The Surreal Life began airing on January 9, 2005, and starred Da Brat, Adrianne Curry, Christopher Knight, Chyna, Marcus Schenkenberg, Verne Troyer, and Jane Wiedlin. Notable moments included conflict between Da Brat and Wiedlin that stemmed from comments made by Da Brat about Wiedlin that were shown during "Dirty Laundry," and the strained relationship between Chyna and her now-ex-boyfriend Sean Waltman. More memorable moments included Troyer getting drunk on the first day and urinating in the weight room, and Wiedlin getting upset about the group being asked to brand a cow. Like the season prior, another romance-themed spin-off, My Fair Brady, was developed around the romantic escapades of Curry and Knight.

=== Season 5 ===
The fifth season of The Surreal Life began airing on July 10, 2005, and starred Caprice Bourret, Jose Canseco, Sandy "Pepa" Denton, Janice Dickinson, Carey Hart, Omarosa Manigault, and Bronson Pinchot. This season played up on the show's namesake surreality by having the house decorated with a circus/carnival theme and the cast was given circus-style taglines during the introduction. This was enhanced with the introduction of a three-legged dog named Lucky. An ongoing feud between Manigault and Dickinson was a key focus point in the season, which ended with Dickinson leaving the house during the final dinner.

=== Season 6 ===
The sixth season of The Surreal Life began airing on March 19, 2006, and starred Alexis Arquette, C.C. DeVille, Steve Harwell, Sherman Hemsley, Maven Huffman, Tawny Kitaen, and Andrea Lowell. Florence Henderson ("Dr. Flo") assisted the cast as the house therapist. Throughout the two weeks, the cast shot a music video, produced and broadcast a live news program, booked and hosted their own talk-show pilots, and participated in a "battle of the bands" competition. During the talk-show episode, Marla Gibbs makes a cameo appearance with Hemsley, and the two recreate their retorts and putdowns as Florence and George from The Jeffersons. Arquette brings the transgender community increased visibility and awareness with her appearance in the series. And, struggling with memory and enunciation problems that grow worse, Kitaen is inexplicably left crawling on the floor of a closet by the final episode.

=== Season 7 ===
Announced in July 2021, the seventh season starred August Alsina, CJ Perry, Dennis Rodman, Frankie Muniz, Kim Coles, Manny MUA, Stormy Daniels, and Tamar Braxton living together and competing in a series of challenges with MTV Entertainment Studios producing the seventh season alongside 51 Minds Entertainment who was returning to produce the series.

=== Season 8 ===
On September 13, 2023, it was reported that the series would move to MTV for its eighth season, and would star Macy Gray, Chet Hanks, Ally Brooke, O.T. Genasis, Kim Zolciak, Josie Canseco, Johnny Weir, and Tyler Posey, with production scheduled to start that month.

== Episodes ==
=== Series overview ===
Season	Episodes	Originally released		
Season	Episodes	First released	Last released	Network
1	8	January 9, 2003	February 20, 2003	The WB
2	6	January 11, 2004	February 22, 2004	The WB
3	12	September 5, 2004	December 5, 2004	VH1
4	12	January 9, 2005	May 1, 2005	VH1
5	12	July 10, 2005	October 9, 2005	VH1
6	9	March 19, 2006	May 14, 2006	VH1
7	6	October 24, 2022	November 21, 2022	VH1
8	8	July 23, 2024	September 3, 2024	MTV

=== Season 1 (2003) ===
No. overall	No. in season	Title	Original release date
1	1	"A Surreal Beginning"	January 9, 2003
2	2	"A Surreal Beginning"	January 9, 2003
3	3	"Stars Under the Stars"	January 16, 2003
4	4	"Backyard Talent Show"	January 22, 2003
5	5	"Sincity to Saved"	January 30, 2003
6	6	"Brande Needs a Man"	February 6, 2003
7	7	"Softball/Pre-Wedding Jitters"	February 13, 2003
8	8	"Corey's Wedding"	February 20, 2003

=== Season 2 (2004) ===
No. overall	No. in season	Title	Original release date
9	1	"Can't We All Just Get Along"	January 11, 2004
10	2	"Mel's Dinner"	January 18, 2004
11	3	"The Children's Play"	January 25, 2004
12	4	"The Good, the Bad, & the Porn Stars"	February 8, 2004
13	5	"Live Naked Celebrities!"	February 15, 2004
14	6	"Dirty Laundry"	February 22, 2004

=== Season 3 (2004) ===
No. overall	No. in season	Title	Original release date
15	1	"Six Degrees of Irritation"	September 5, 2004
16	2	"Strange Love"	September 12, 2004
17	3	"Battle of the Bands"	September 19, 2004
18	4	"Highway to Hell"	September 26, 2004
19	5	"Surf School"	October 3, 2004
20	6	"Making the Single, Part 1"	October 10, 2004
21	7	"Making the Single, Part 2"	October 17, 2004
22	8	"Haunted Hospital"	October 24, 2004
23	9	"Dirty Laundry"	October 31, 2004
24	10	"Last Supper & Goodbyes"	November 7, 2004
25	11	"Best & Worst"	November 14, 2004
26	12	"Lost Moments"	December 5, 2004

=== Season 4 (2005) ===
No. overall	No. in season	Title	Original release date
27	1	"The Surreal Seven"	January 9, 2005
28	2	"The Kids Are All Wrong"	January 16, 2005
29	3	"Horses, Dwarves & Bears, Oh My!"	January 23, 2005
30	4	"Three Crushes"	January 30, 2005
31	5	"Celebrity Pitch Fest"	February 13, 2005
32	6	"I'm With Cupid"	February 20, 2005
33	7	"Seven Celebrities of Death, Part 1"	March 6, 2005
34	8	"Seven Celebrities of Death, Part 2"	March 27, 2005
35	9	"Dirty Laundry"	April 3, 2005
36	10	"Get Out!!"	April 17, 2005
37	11	"Burning Questions"	April 24, 2005
38	12	"Reunion Show"	May 1, 2005

=== Season 5 (2005) ===
No. overall	No. in season	Title	Original release date
39	1	"No Way It's Jose"	July 10, 2005
40	2	"Sunshine Strikers"	July 17, 2005
41	3	"Take It Off!"	July 24, 2005
42	4	"Backyard Make-Over Surreal Edition"	July 31, 2005
43	5	"Moto-Crossdressers"	August 14, 2005
44	6	"Vegas Dead Ringers"	August 21, 2005
45	7	"Voted Out Of Vegas"	September 4, 2005
46	8	"The Knife Incident, Part 1"	September 11, 2005
47	9	"The Knife Incident, Part 2"	September 18, 2005
48	10	"Dirty Laundry, Part 1"	September 25, 2005
49	11	"Dirty Laundry, Part 2"	October 2, 2005
50	12	"The Last Straw"	October 9, 2005

=== Season 6 (2006) ===
No. overall	No. in season	Title	Original release date
51	1	"Movin' On In"	March 19, 2006
52	2	"Makin' The Video"	March 26, 2006
53	3	"Action News, Part 1"	April 2, 2006
54	4	"Action News, Part 2"	April 9, 2006
55	5	"Tawny Takes On Flo, Part 1"	April 16, 2006
56	6	"Tawny Takes On Flo, Part 2"	April 23, 2006
57	7	"Battle Of The 80's Hair Bands"	April 30, 2006
58	8	"Flo's Final Word"	May 7, 2006
59	9	"Check-out is at Noon"	May 14, 2006

=== Season 7 (2022) ===
No. overall	No. in season	Title	Original release date
60	1	"Welcome to The Surreal Life"	October 24, 2022
61	2	"A Surreal Life Family BBQ"	October 24, 2022
62	3	"How Did We Get Here?"	October 31, 2022
63	4	"A Second Chance For Dennis"	November 14, 2022
64	5	"Surreal Theater"	November 21, 2022
65	6	"Rollercoaster Ride"	November 21, 2022

=== Season 8: Villa of Secrets (2024) ===
No. overall	No. in season	Title	Original release date
66	1	"Welcome to The Villa of Secrets"	July 23, 2024
67	2	"Building Surreal Bonds"	July 23, 2024
68	3	"Colombia Crowns A Winner"	July 30, 2024
69	4	"Secret Rendezvous"	August 6, 2024
70	5	"Sloan's Secret Guest"	August 13, 2024
71	6	"A Different Kind of Spiritual Awakening"	August 20, 2024
72	7	"Leaving Their Mark On Medellin"	August 27, 2024
73	8	"All is Revealed"	September 3, 2024

== Home media ==
Seasons one, two, and five were released in the United States, but have since been discontinued. All six seasons have been released on DVD in Australia by Shock Records.

Season	Release dates		Discs
Season	Region 1	Region 0	Discs
1 & 2	1 December 2004		3
1		1 November 2008	2
2		10 January 2009	2
3		10 January 2009	3
4		14 March 2009	3
5	18 September 2005	12 June 2009	3
6		14 August 2009	2

== Spin-offs ==
The Surreal Life is one of VH1's most spun-off shows, with a complex web of reality series which have had spin-off shows themselves. The first spin-off from The Surreal Life was Strange Love, starring Flavor Flav and Brigitte Nielsen, both of season three. It premiered in January 2005 and ran for 11 episodes. The second spin-off, My Fair Brady, starred Adrianne Curry and Christopher Knight. It ran its first season in 2005, concluding with the couple's engagement. The second season debuted in the spring 2006, concluding with a wedding. The third season premiered on January 20, 2008, and detailed the newlyweds' lives as they prepared to expand their family.

The Surreal Life: Fame Games reunited cast members of the original Surreal Life series in a competition for cash and prizes.

Pepa received her own two shows stemming from her popularity on VH1. She teamed up with her old partner Cheryl "Salt" James for The Salt-N-Pepa Show, which showcased the two distinct personalities clash on many issues from their break-up as a group in the 1990s to their current reformation. The series spanned two seasons. In 2010, Pepa also received her own show on VH1 that documented her search for her Mr. Right, titled Let's Talk About Pep.

=== Of Love series ===
Strange Love itself produced a spin-off show, titled Flavor of Love, which lasted for three seasons, ending with Flav's announcement that he had found his one true love. Due to the show's great success, it spawned a successful franchise with Rock of Love with Bret Michaels.

==== Contestant dating shows ====
Some contestants went on to star in their own dating show spinoffs. The first was Flavor of Love's Tiffany Pollard, a.k.a. New York, with I Love New York (two seasons). Three of her suitors got their own show: Brothers Kamal "Chance" and Ahmad "Real" Givens starred in Real Chance of Love (two seasons) and Frank "The Entertainer" Maresca starred in Frank the Entertainer in a Basement Affair. Rock of Love with Bret Michaels had proposed spin-offs that never came to fruition with contestants Heather Chadwell (I Heart Heather), Lacey Conner (I Love Lacey), Destiney Sue Moore (Destiny of Love), and Kristy Joe Muller. The spinoffs that actually came to fruition were Daisy of Love featuring Daisy de la Hoya, which aired one season, and Megan Hauserman's Megan Wants a Millionaire, which was pulled after three episodes.

==== Game shows ====
Contestants from Flavor of Love, Rock of Love with Bret Michaels, and Real Chance of Love were offered to participate in Charm School, which lasted three seasons, with the premise of bettering themselves and a chance at a cash prize.

Contestants from Flavor of Love, Rock of Love, I Love New York, Real Chance of Love, For the Love of Ray J, Rock of Love Bus, Daisy of Love, and Megan Wants a Millionaire were allowed to take part in I Love Money, a Survivor elimination-style show held in a Mexican mansion. Four seasons were produced but the third never aired due to the involvement of Ryan Jenkins.

==== Unscripted shows ====
Contestants New York, Real and Chance later starred in additional unscripted shows. New York Goes to Hollywood followed Pollard's attempt at becoming an actress, New York Goes to Work saw Tiffany Pollard perform various jobs as voted by the viewers on a weekly basis, and Real and Chance: The Legend Hunters followed the Givens brothers in their quest to find legendary monsters such as Bigfoot.
