= Swab Stories =

American television series

Swab Stories is a reality television series that aired on VH1 for eight episodes starting in April 2015. The series follows Jared Rosenthal, the owner of Health Street and driver of its mobile DNA testing RV. Rosenthal had the RV painted with custom graffiti and the slogan "Who's Your Daddy?" by the well known Bronx-based graffiti artists, Tats Cru. The TV series follows Rosenthal and his assistant, Ana Lopez, as they speak with, swab, and reveal results to their DNA testing clients in NYC, Chicago, and Washington DC. The clients come with burning questions about whether or not a close relationship is biologically true, and the DNA test results reveal answers about paternity, brotherhood and sisterhood.

== Premise ==
The show features Jared Rosenthal, who provides mobile DNA testing services from his RV laboratory. Each episode includes clients who approach the RV with questions regarding their familial relationships, like paternity or sibling confirmations. Often, the questions for which they seek answers revolve around long held suspicions about spousal betrayals, their family history, or whispered rumors they have heard for years. The DNA tests often lead to dramatic revelations and emotional moments of closure or connection, and plenty of tear drops.

== Production ==
Swab Stories premiered on VH1 on April 29, 2015, and ran for one season. Each of its eight episode was 30 minutes long and featured 3 DNA test stories. Jared Rosenthal, the owner of Health Street and driver of its Who's Your Daddy Truck, was the host of the show. His assistant, Ana Lopez, an RN, added a layer of comedy and much needed levity to the serious drama that often unfolded on the RV when DNA test results were revealed.

The show was produced by PowderHouse Productions. SeanBaker Carter was the driving force behind the production. Royd Chung was the Show Runner. Executive Producer credits included both Rosenthal and Carter.

== Reception ==
The show received positive reviews from a small but devoted audience. Critics praised its emotional depth and unique premise, and also raised questions about the ethics of broadcasting such personal family matters on reality television. A review in the Washington Post featured an episode of two sisters in Washington, D.C., who were separated at birth and reunited on the show."

On review aggregator Rotten Tomatoes, Swab Stories holds no critical score.

== Legacy ==
Swab Stories is remembered for its authenticity. Airing at a time when most people thought of DNA testing as the purview of shock-talk shows like Maury and Springer, Swab Stories brought a human angle to the exploration of how people react when they discover the truth about some of their closest held beliefs. Jared Rosenthal became widely recognized for his unique "Who's Your Daddy RV".
