= Chris Gore =

American film critic

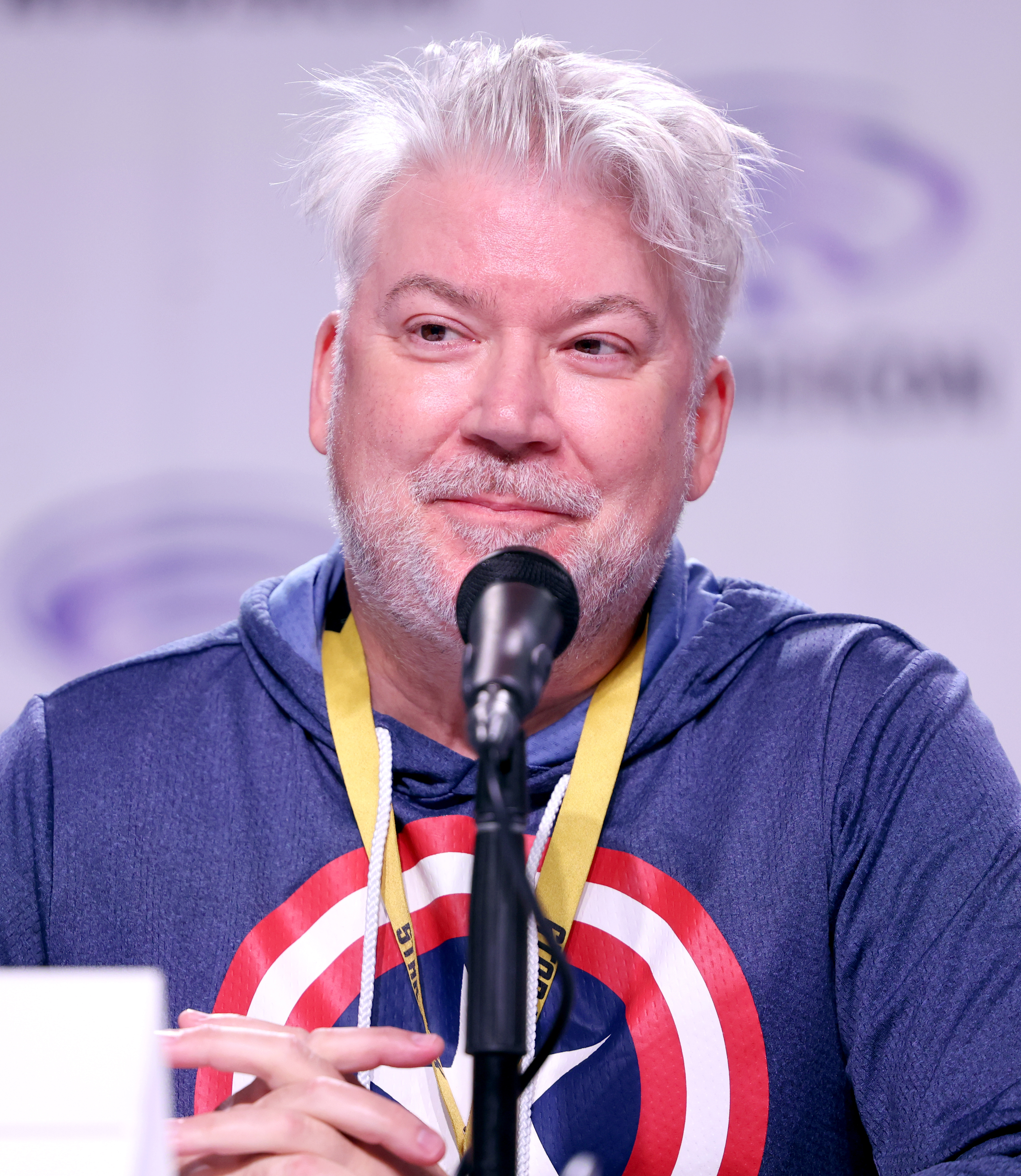
- Gore in 2026
- Born: Christopher Patrick Gore; September 5, 1965 (age 61); Big Rapids, Michigan, U.S.
- Other name: Christian Gore
- Education: Wayne State University
- Occupations: Writer, film critic, editor

Christopher Patrick Gore (born September 5, 1965) is an American speaker and writer on the topic of independent film. He founded, edited and wrote for Film Threat magazine and website and other film sites. He was producer, writer or host for several TV series, such as Attack of the Show. He created several films and shorts like My Big Fat Independent Movie. He authored several books on filmmaking.

== Early life ==
Gore was born in Big Rapids, Michigan and attended Kimball High School in Royal Oak, Michigan.

Gore was a film student at Detroit's Wayne State University, but he dropped out after starting Film Threat.

== Career ==
Gore is the head writer and the founder of Film Threat magazine, a project covering independent and underground film which he started in 1985.

Early in his career, he had created several short films as Christian Gore: Betaville, Doorman, Red, and Ouch!. He also made an hour-long docudrama, Cool Teenager from the Planet X. He sold some of these through Film Threat Video.

Gore became the Editor in Chief of the newly renamed magazine VideoGames - The Ultimate Gaming Magazine, starting with the September 1993 issue until the December 1995 issue. During this time, he also made his first television appearances on the Jones Computer Network, the network television precursor to ZDTV, as an editorialist and commentator on the state of video games and society.

Gore was a recurring host on the G4 television program Attack of the Show for the DVDuesday segment, reviewing DVDs. He had also done a film-related segment on the weekly FX series The X Show. He was also the host and moderator of The New Movie Show with Chris Gore, also on FX, in 2000, where a panel mixed between critics and celebrity guests reviewed movies. G4 then based a recurring gag in an August 2010 episode of Attack of the Show on the murder of Chris Gore, bringing up three potential murderers each - furthering the idea that his movies are horrible and that everyone wanted to kill him.

Gore co-wrote and produced the independent parody film My Big Fat Independent Movie, a comedy spoof of other indie films featuring Pauly Shore. His books include The 50 Greatest Movies Never Made, The Ultimate Film Festival Survival Guide and The Complete DVD Book: Designing, Producing and Marketing Your Independent Film on DVD. Gore also co-created Sci-Fi Universe magazine and created the now-defunct Wild Cartoon Kingdom magazine. The latter was used by John Kricfalusi under the pen name "Thomas Paine" to anonymously criticize Nickelodeon following his September 1992 firing from The Ren & Stimpy Show. In 2004, he hosted the game show Ultimate Film Fanatic.

In 2016, Gore was interviewed in the Star Wars documentary film The Prequels Strike Back: A Fan's Journey.

In 2023, Gore released the documentary Attack of the Doc about the history of G4.

== Personal life ==
Gore lives in Los Angeles, California.

== See also ==
- Indiewood
- Cinephilia
