= Gary Auerbach =

American television and film writer, director and producer

Gary Auerbach is an American television and film writer, director and producer. He graduated from Livingston High School and the University of Delaware, where he earned a degree in Economics.

His first job in entertainment was as a film editor at EMC a trailer house in New York City. He then began to work at MTV where he produced several shows, including Jon Stewart's You Wrote You Watch It, the live Hangin with MTV, and the Peabody Award-winning Decade.

In 1995, he moved to Los Angeles where he executive produced MTV’s dating show “Singled Out” starring Chris Hardwick and Jenny McCarthy.

In 1996, he wrote and directed the feature film Just Your Luck. In 1997, he founded “Mindless Entertainment” with then-partner Mark Cronin. Mindless's initial production slate included The X Show and The New Movie Show with Chris Gore.

In 2002, Auerbach founded Go Go Luckey Entertainment with his wife, Julie Auerbach. The company broke out to mainstream success with Laguna Beach: The Real Orange County, which created a completely new genre of reality television; Jockeys, Brad Meltzer’s Decoded, and Paranormal State, among others.

Auerbach left Go Go Luckey in 2013 to oversee Wilshire Studios for NBC Universal. There he oversaw productions of The Soup, Fashion Police, Baggage on the Run, and Live from the Red Carpet. Go Go Luckey was sold to Eclipse Television in 2015.

In 2015, he began producing under a new banner, Auerbach Entertainment, that had a first look deal with Gail Berman’s The Jackal Group.

Under Auerbach Entertainment he has a documentary for Oxygen, King of Diamonds, as well as several other projects in development.

== Productions ==
- Alectrixs
- American Haunting
- Brad Meltzer’s Decoded
- Deep Fried
- Eden’s World
- Exorcist Files
- Fashionista Diaries
- Ghost Lab
- Hampton High
- Hangar 1
- Jockeys
- Just Your Luck
- Karoake Superstars
- Kidnapped
- Laguna Beach: The Real Orange County
- Lost Tapes
- Nashville
- Newport Beach: The Real Orange County
- Paradise City
- Paranormal State
- Pretty Hurts
- Punk’d
- Roller Girls
- Singled Out
- The Great American Christmas
- The New Movie Show with Chris Gore
- The Occupants
- The X Show
