= The X Show =

American TV program

- Presented by: Mark DeCarlo; Berglind Icey; Craig Jackson; Courtney Birch; Chris Gore; Jillian Barberie; Ari Sandel; Ava Cadell; Daphne Brogdon
- Country of origin: United States
- No. of episodes: 19

Production
- Running time: 60 minutes
- Production companies: Mindless Entertainment; Fox Television Studios

Original release
- Network: FX
- Release: May 31, 1999 – April 2001

The X Show is a magazine, variety, and interview/talk program that aired on FX in the United States from May 31, 1999, to April 2001. Running time was originally one hour, but this was later reduced to a half-hour. The show was 'guy-themed' much like a TV equivalent of Maxim magazine (e.g., co-host Daphne Brogdon would conduct hot tub interviews.) The X Show had numerous hosts and co-hosts, both male and female and would frequently feature spokesmodels. Ava Cadell was featured in segments providing sexual information and Chris Gore would host segments about movies.
