= Strange Love =

- Created by: Cris Abrego; Mark Cronin
- Starring: Flavor Flav; Brigitte Nielsen
- Composers: Adam Zelking; Dan Radlaur
- Country of origin: United States
- Original language: English
- No. of seasons: 1
- No. of episodes: 11

Production
- Executive producers: Cris Abrego; Mark Cronin; Ben Samek; Jill Modabber; Jeff Olde
- Producer: Chris Brewster
- Cinematography: Bruce Ready
- Running time: 44 minutes (3 episodes); 22 minutes (8 episodes)
- Production companies: Mindless Entertainment; 51 Pictures; VH1 Productions

Original release
- Network: VH1
- Release: January 9 – April 24, 2005

Related
- The Surreal Life; Flavor of Love

Strange Love is an American reality television series featuring Brigitte Nielsen and Flavor Flav that aired on VH1. Sparked by their on-screen romance in the third season of VH1's The Surreal Life, it is a spin-off that focused solely on Brigitte and Flav. The series premiered on January 9, 2005 and ended its run on April 24, 2005.

Due to mutual jealousy, the couple was constantly fighting and yelling, and they went their separate ways in the end, with Nielsen choosing instead to live with her Italian boyfriend, Mattia Dessi. Flavor Flav would go on to have his own reality show, Flavor of Love, where he continued to search for love.

== Episodes ==
1. "The Flavor of Love" – aired: January 9, 2005 (1.8M viewers)
2. "The Smack Is Back" – aired: January 16, 2005
3. "Balls Well That Ends Well" – aired: January 23, 2005
4. "The Wine, The Romance, and The Truth" – aired: January 30, 2005
5. "Flav's Fried Chicken" – aired: February 13, 2005
6. "Public Enemy Number 1" – aired: February 20, 2005
7. "Bronx Cheers" – aired: March 6, 2005
8. "The Family That Flav's Together, Stays Together" – aired: March 27, 2005
9. "Flav Can't Lose" – aired: April 3, 2005
10. "You May Now Flav the Bride" – aired: April 10, 2005
11. "Reunion" – aired: April 24, 2005

== Controversy ==
North Carolina's Reverend Paul Scott labeled Flav's performance "a coon act on a modern-day minstrel show."

Flav's friend and fellow Public Enemy member Chuck D accused VH1 of "Flavsploitation" in a journal entry regarding the March 27 episode, which showed a tense conflict between Flav, three of his children and their mother.

"Peeps will let the Bridgette [sic] thing perhaps slide, but not the wild statements and what seems like a disrespect conflict on camera with his children and their mother. Last week, it was that same part of his family who went on Wendy Williams' program and launched the worst on-air diatribe ever directed at a father by his children."

Flav responded by saying,

"I want Strange Love to be a mirror for them. I want them to see themselves, because they did disrespect me also. But that's their mother. When children grow up without both parents, there's an imbalance – and what you see on the show with my kids is an imbalance... But I love my kids."
