= Idiotest =

American television game show (2014–2017)

- Genre: Game show
- Created by: Adam Rosenblatt; Jamie Rosenblatt
- Developed by: Mark Cronin
- Written by: J. Chris Newberg
- Directed by: Dana Calderwood
- Presented by: Ben Gleib
- Theme music composer: Jude Christodal
- Opening theme: HBD
- Country of origin: United States
- Original language: English
- No. of seasons: 4
- No. of episodes: 212

Production
- Executive producers: Adam Rosenblatt; Jamie Rosenblatt; Christian Horner; Ryan Devlin; Shawn Greenson; Larry Barron; Ryan Curtis; Mark Cronin; Craig Brooks
- Producers: Ben Gleib; Karissa Noel; Timothy Tyson; Dave Schapiro
- Production location: Sunset Las Palmas Studios
- Editors: Frederick Chappell; Dana Delametter; Joanne de Tora; Brett Jozel
- Running time: 20−22 minutes
- Production companies: Little Wooden Boat Productions, Inc.; H2R Productions; He Shoots, He Scores! Entertainment

Original release
- Network: Game Show Network
- Release: August 12, 2014 – August 30, 2017

Idiotest (a portmanteau of "idiot" and "test" and stylized as Idᴉotest) is an American television game show broadcast by Game Show Network (GSN). Hosted by Ben Gleib, the series features contestants in teams of two competing to answer brain teaser and puzzle questions. The winning team advances to a bonus round for an opportunity to increase their winnings to $10,000. The series was announced at GSN's upfront presentation in March 2014, and the first episode premiered on August 12, 2014 of that year. On December 15, 2018, the first season became available to watch on Netflix.

Critical reception for the series has been mixed, with one writer calling it "enjoyable" while another called it "uninteresting." Additionally, GSN released an online game midway through the first season that allows users to answer questions from the series' past episodes.

== Gameplay ==
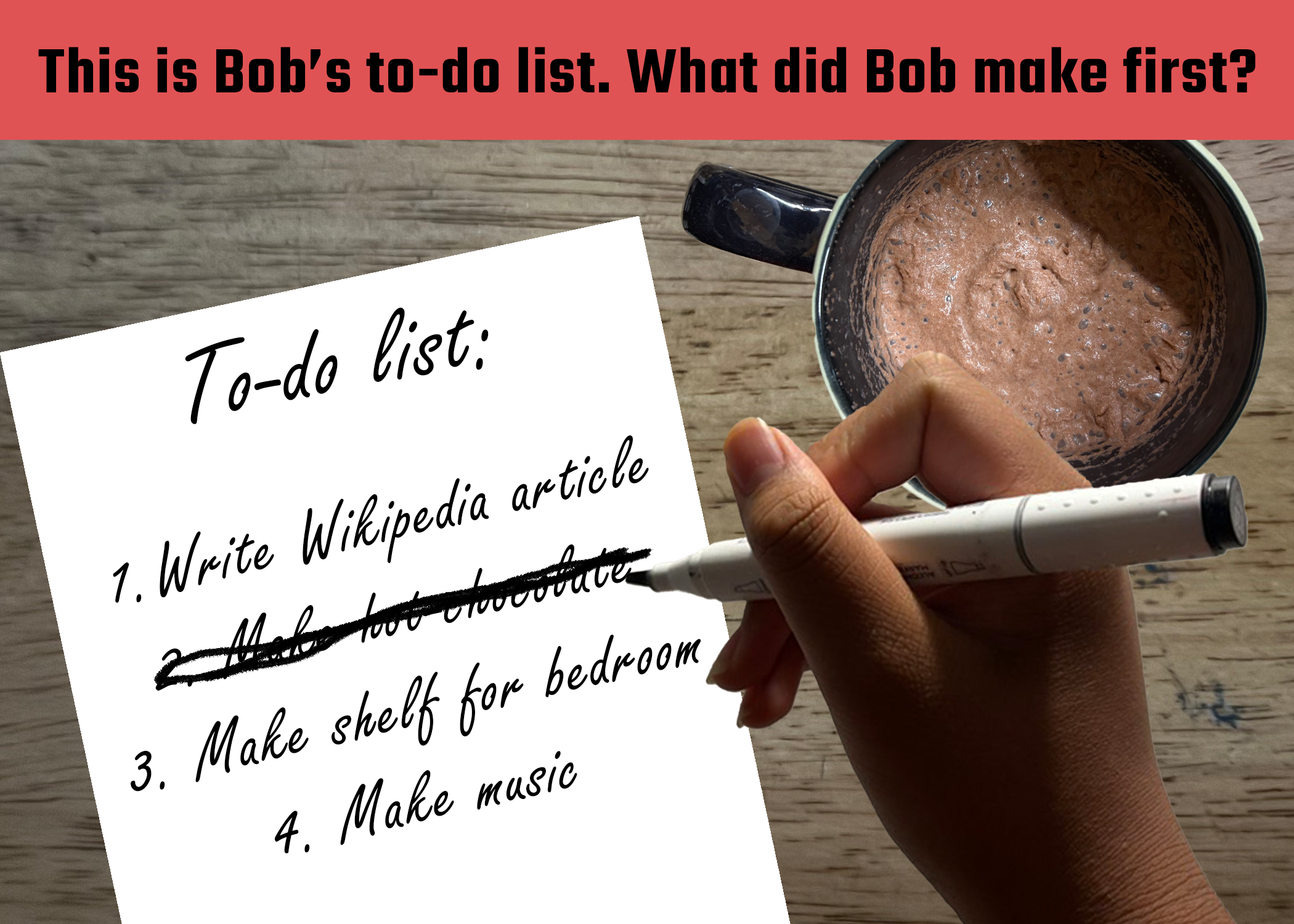
A type of puzzle that could found on the show. At first glance, the correct option looks to be to click the mug of hot chocolate or the phrase "Make hot chocolate", because the task is crossed off and hot chocolate can be seen in the image. In actuality, the correct answer is the to-do list, because Bob had to make the to-do list before anything else.

The main game features two pairs of contestants answering brain-teaser questions taking the form of a visual puzzle. In the first round, each team faces two questions. Contestants can work together and must answer by touching the correct answer (or answers, depending on what the question is asking them) on the screen. The question is often phrased so that the contestants may be misled if they do not read it correctly (for example, "Touch the largest greenhouse" could be misread as "Touch the largest green house"). Contestants may also be required to know a lesser-known definition of a common word (for example, "Habit", referring to a religious garment instead of a pattern of behavior). The contestant may also be given words that can be easily confused with others (for example, "Bass", referring to either a fish or a guitar, the correct answer being dependent on how the host pronounces the word). The value of these questions begins at $300, with $20 deducted for every second the team takes in answering; the money begins counting down on the "money meter" when the puzzle first appears on the screen. Each contestant's money meter stops counting down when an answer is chosen on the touchscreen. For all questions, a correct answer puts the remaining money in their team's bank, while an incorrect answer or running out of time on a question (the money meter thereby reaches zero and reads "IDIOT" in big letters) wins nothing.

In round two, contestants, without the help of their partners, are given their own questions to answer. The opening value of each question is $500, decreasing by $25 each second until an answer is given.

In the third round, one contestant from each team faces the same question simultaneously. This easier question starts at $1,000 and decreases by $50 per second. The remaining contestant from each team then faces a more difficult question, with an opening value of $2,500 decreasing by $100 per second. The host usually reads the question to the contestants during this round. After this second question, the team that has more money wins the game, keeps their bank, and plays the Smart Money round for a chance to increase their winnings to $10,000. In some episodes—especially (though not exclusively) those featuring celebrities playing for charity—the losing team also receives money.

=== Smart Money Round ===
In the Smart Money round, which features the most difficult, and possibly the most extremely logical question in the program, each member of the winning team plays the same question individually. The question often requires very keen eyes or very literal-minded thinking to reach the answer, to an even greater degree than the previous questions. For example, a contestant having to "touch the state that includes a six-letter state," with the answer being Arkansas; ArKansas. While the first contestant is asked the question, the second is isolated offstage so that they cannot see or hear the question. The two teammates have a total of 40 seconds (that is, when the first contestant answers, the second one is only given whatever time the first one had left when they answered) to answer the same question (in seasons 1 and 2, the time limit was 30 seconds). The clock stops when the first contestant submits an answer and resumes when the second contestant first sees the question. If one team member answers the question correctly they receive an additional $1,000; if both answer correctly their winnings are augmented to $10,000.

Midway through the first season, another version of the "Smart Money Round" was introduced requiring a team to correctly answer five questions in 60 seconds, with five-second penalties for wrong answers. Each correct answer is worth $500 and stops the clock, with five correct answers winning $10,000. This version, however, was quickly sacked as contestants would panic and guess randomly, running the timer down fast; the farthest any contestant got was the third question.

=== Online version ===
An online game based on the series was developed for GSN's website midway through the show's first season. The game allowed online users to answer questions seen on the actual show. Answering a certain number of questions correctly allowed players to level up and face more difficult questions; a total of 34 levels were available.

== Production ==
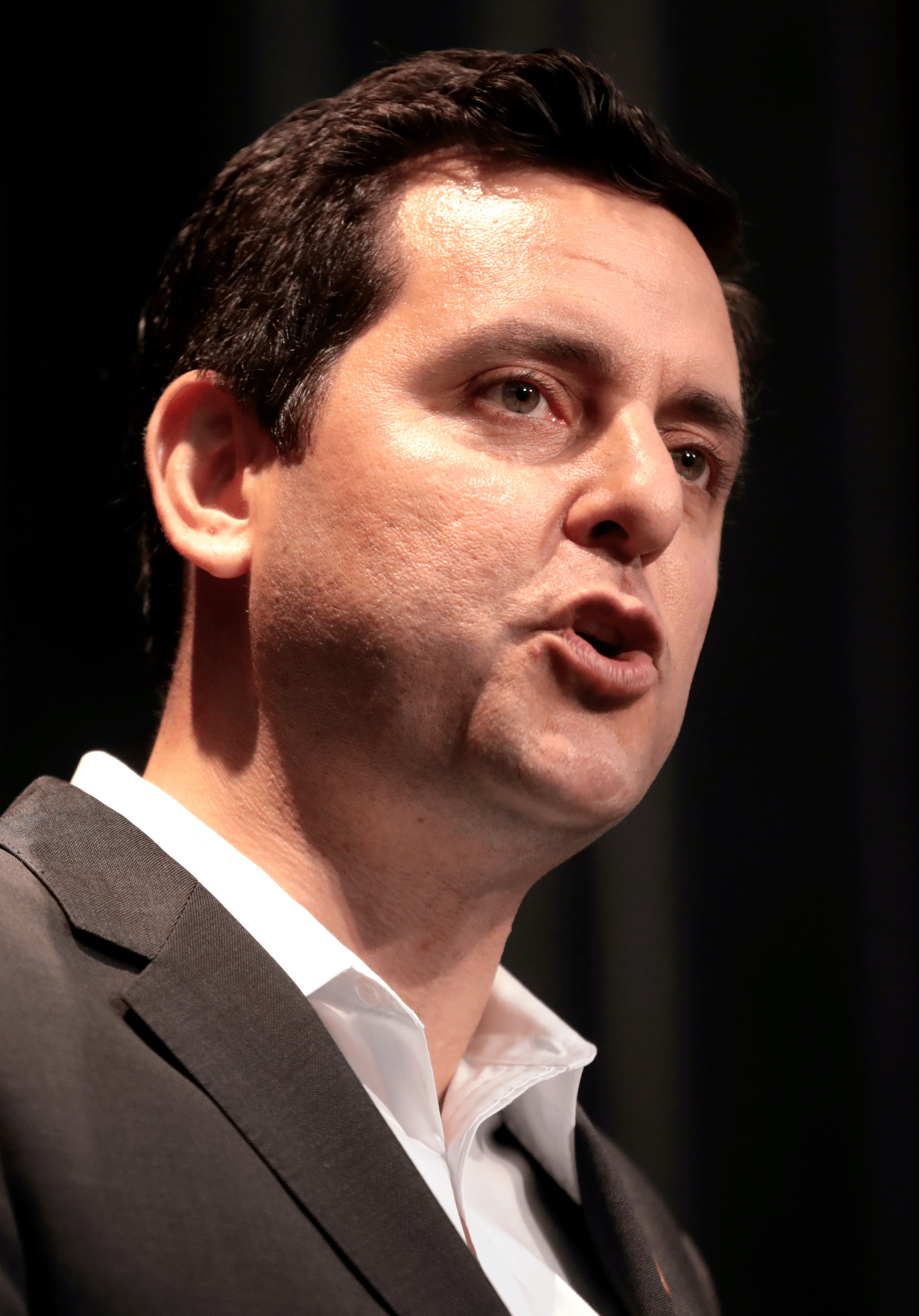
Ben Gleib, host of Idiotest

The show received very little advance press before it was announced at GSN's 2014–15 upfront presentation on March 18, 2014. At the presentation, GSN revealed plans to order 40 episodes of the series, while confirming August 12 as the premiere date on June 19, 2014. On October 28, 2014, the show was renewed for a 65-episode second season, which began airing April 1, 2015. The series was renewed for a 40-episode third season on March 16, 2016, with the season premiere airing on April 12, 2016. Idiotest was then renewed for a 65-episode fourth season, which premiered January 19, 2017, alongside GSN's new show, Divided.

The series has also produced some special editions featuring contestants from a preexisting rivalry. These episodes have included competitions between USC and UCLA graduates, as well as an Election Day special between pairs of Democrats and Republicans. This theme was revived with a special episode entitled Political Idiotest, which both taped and aired April 20, 2016, and featured brain teasers referring to political subjects.

== Reception ==
The series has received mixed reviews from critics. Carrie Grosvenor of About Entertainment argued that the series is "truly enjoyable to watch" while calling Gleib's hosting "sarcastic and funny." Conversely, Tim Conroy of Media Life Magazine argued that the show "just doesn't do the trick" and thought Gleib had a difficult time "drawing amusing responses from the contestants." Neil Genzlinger of The New York Times was equally unimpressed, saying that the show had "low ambitions" and arguing that Gleib's hosting made the show "even more uninteresting." In 2016, Neal Justin of The Atlanta Journal-Constitution mentioned the series in an article analyzing the challenges of many modern knowledge-based game shows; specifically, he mentioned that the series' "optical illusions, deceptive directions and mind tricks can make even Mensa members look like, well, idiots."

Paired with the mixed critical reception, the series has seen a wide range of ratings for new episodes, bringing in between 245,000 and 561,000 total viewers during the first season. The season two double-episode premiere drew 388,000 and 360,000 viewers respectively, while the third season averaged around 400,000 viewers.
