= Money Hungry =

2010 American reality television series

- Created by: Cris Abrego; Ellen Rakieten
- Directed by: Matt Bordofsky
- Presented by: Dan Cortese
- Composers: Jude Christodal; Adam Zelkind; Dan Radlauer
- Country of origin: United States
- No. of seasons: 1
- No. of episodes: 10

Production
- Executive producers: Cris Abrego; Ellen Rakieten; Ben Samek; Matt Odgers; Rabih Gholam; Jeff Olde; Jill Holmes; Kristen Kelly
- Cinematography: Adrian Pruett
- Production companies: 51 Minds Entertainment; Ellen Rakieten Entertainment

Original release
- Network: VH1
- Release: 2 August – 4 October 2010

Money Hungry is a reality television weight loss competition show based on bet dieting, with twelve teams of two competing for a $100,000 prize made up from team contributions.

== Contestants ==
Cast

Name	Team	Eliminated
Mark Petrozzella	Mission Slimpossible	Winner
Joseph "Joe" Verriotto	Mission Slimpossible	Winner
Potu "Po" Peleti	The Regulators	Runner-Up
Dave Schenone	The Regulators	Runner-Up
Missy Bartolini	Grading Curves	Episode 10
Tricia Cestone	Grading Curves	Episode 10
Jackie Searle	Slenderellas	Episode 9
Kaitlin Landis	Slenderellas	Episode 9
Stephanie Lynn	Flabulous	Episode 8
Phillip L.	Flabulous	Episode 8
Tammy Atmore	Double Chocolate	Episode 7
Georgette Douglas	Double Chocolate	Episode 7
Melissa Boughton	No Excuses	Episode 6
Josh Graston	No Excuses	Episode 6
Bridget Sweeney	Chicago Deep Dish	Episode 5
Marilu Sanchez	Chicago Deep Dish	Episode 5
Yamil Piedra	A Pair of Nuts	Episode 4
Johnny Trabanco	A Pair of Nuts	Episode 4
Elizabeth "Beth" Kulp	Rocker Moms	Episode 3
Carrie Falquist	Rocker Moms	Episode 3
Shanté Gordon	Roll Models	Episode 2
Jamie Litt	Roll Models	Episode 2
Katie Skorka	Family Sized	Episode 1
Denise Skorka	Family Sized	Episode 1

== Weigh-ins and eliminations ==
Team	Start Weight	Episodes, New Weight (% Lost/+% if Gain)										
Team	Start Weight	1	2	3	4	5	6	7	8	9	10	Finale
Mission Slimpossible	508	485 (4.5%)	484 (0.2%)	475 (1.9%)	456 (4.0%)	447 (2.0%)	438 (2.0%)	446 (1.8%)	443 (1.1%)	422 (3.7%)	427 (+1.2%)	406 (20.1%)
The Regulators	850	816 (4.0%)	799 (2.1%)	781 (2.3%)	780 (0.1%)	773 (0.9%)	747 (3.4%)	747 (0.0%)	735 (1.1%)	718 (2.3%)	707 (1.5%)	692 (18.6%)
Grading Curves	502	490 (2.4%)	476 (2.9%)	467 (1.9%)	468 (0.2%)	457 (2.1%)	450 (1.5%)	452 (0.4%)	436 (3.1%)	433 (0.7%)	429 (0.9%)	
Slenderellas	615	594 (3.4%)	581 (2.2%)	574 (1.2%)	572 (0.4%)	567 (0.9%)	572 (0.9%)	558 (1.6%)	549 (1.6%)	540 (-1.6%)		
Flabulous	653	631 (3.2%)	624 (1.1%)	614 (1.6%)	609 (0.8%)	606 (0.5%)	603 (0.5%)	595 (1.3%)	593 (0.3%)			
Double Chocolate	451	438 (2.9%)	427 (2.5%)	423 (0.9%)	422 (0.2%)	417 (1.2%)	415 (0.5%)	409 (1.5%)				
No Excuses	643	619 (3.7%)	607 (1.9%)	595 (2.0%)	590 (0.8%)	579 (1.9%)	577 (0.4%)					
Chicago Deep Dish	460	439 (4.6%)	428 (2.5%)	423 (1.2%)	419 (1.0%)	417 (0.5%)						
A Pair of Nuts	544	529 (2.8%)	525 (0.8%)	516 (1.7%)	500 (3.1%)							
Rocker Moms	476	465 (2.3%)	456 (1.9%)	450 (1.3%)								
Roll Models	478	457 (4.4%)	446 (2.4%)									
Family Sized	623	612 (1.8%)										

The team won the competition.
The team was the Big Heavies and was immune from elimination.
The team was saved from elimination by the Big Heavies.
The team lost the challenge and was put up for elimination.
The team received the most votes and was put up for elimination, but lost the most percentage of weight at the weigh-in compared to the others.
The team received the most votes and was eliminated for having lost the least percentage of weight at the weigh-in compared to the others.
The team lost the challenge, was put up for elimination, and was eliminated for having lost the least percentage of weight at the weigh-in compared to the others.
The team had the lowest percentage of weight lost and was eliminated.

== Episodes ==
Episode 1 - "Put Your Money Where Your Mouth Is"

First aired 2 August 2010

Our first introduction to the teams, the show opens with the contestants being forced off the cushy bus and made to hike up the hill to the house.

- Bottom 2 Teams: Family-Sized, Flabulous
- Eliminated: Family-Sized

Episode 2 - "All's Fair in Love and Weight Loss"

First aired 9 August 2010

Scheming begins, and a school-boy crush Josh has on Jamie threatens his alliances.

- Big Heavies (Challenge Winner): A Pair of Nuts
- Saved by the Big Heavies: Mission Slimpossible
- Bottom Teams: Double Chocolate, Roll Models
- Eliminated: Roll Models

Episode 3 - "Welcome to the Family"

First aired 16 August 2010

After half the house (Slimpossible, Nuts, Chicago, Grading and Rocker Moms) bands together as "The Orphanage", the other half counters and becomes "The Family".

- Big Heavies (Challenge Winner): Mission Slimpossible
- Saved by the Big Heavies: A Pair of Nuts
- Bottom Teams: Flabulous, No Excuses, Rocker Moms
- Eliminated: Rocker Moms

Episode 4 - "Bust a Move"

First aired 23 August 2010

Tempers flare and things get heated when the Regulators and Mission Slimpossible get physical.

- Big Heavies (Challenge Winner): The Regulators
- Saved by the Big Heavies: Double Chocolate
- Bottom Teams: A Pair of Nuts, Mission Slimpossible
- Eliminated: A Pair of Nuts

Episode 5 - "The Way The Cookie Crumbles"

First aired 30 August 2010 No house vote this week leads everyone to butter up to the Big Heavies, who turn the tables by saving no one, and Josh turns his affections toward Stephanie.

- Big Heavies (Challenge Winner): The Regulators
- Eliminated: Chicago Deep Dish

Episode 6 - "The Puzzle Master"

First aired 6 September 2010

The teams are thrown a curve when the week's challenge is not only physical, but mental as well.

- Big Heavies (Challenge Winner): Slenderellas
- Saved by the Big Heavies: Flabulous
- Bottom Teams: Grading Curves, Mission Slimpossible, No Excuses
- Eliminated: No Excuses

Episode 7 - "This Means War"

First aired 13 September 2010

The joy of being at the Rose Bowl stadium is diminished by the challenge: running up and down the stairs, transporting 100 footballs. Alliances shift as teams claim deals were made earlier.

- Big Heavies (Challenge Winner): Mission Slimpossible
- Saved by the Big Heavies: Grading Curves
- Bottom Teams: Double Chocolate, Slenderellas
- Eliminated: Double Chocolate

Episode 8 - "A Kitty With 9 Lives"

First aired 20 September 2010

Another puzzle throws off some of the teams. Phillip plays both sides to try and save his team from elimination.

- Big Heavies (Challenge Winner): Mission Slimpossible
- Bottom Teams: Flabulous, Slenderellas
- Eliminated: Flabulous

Episode 9 - "Photo Finish"

First aired 27 September 2010

One team attempts to vote themselves into the bottom in order to eliminate another.

- Big Heavies (Challenge Winner): Grading Curves
- Eliminated: Slenderellas

Episode 10 - "The Ultimate Weigh-In" and Finale

First aired 4 October 2010

In the final challenge, Tricia suffers an injury that puts Grading Curves out of the running. In a surprise gesture of team solidarity, Mission Slimpossible (after getting it back along with the Regulators) give their entry fee to Grading Curves.

- Big Heavies (Challenge Winner): Mission Slimpossible
- Eliminated: Grading Curves

Families gather as the last two teams weigh in and the winner is decided.

- Final Weigh-In Winners: Mission Slimpossible

== Episode Progress ==
#	Contestants	Episodes										
#	Contestants	1	2	3	4	5	6	7	8	9	10	Finale
1	Mission Slimpossible	SAFE	HIGH	WIN	LOW	SAFE	LOW	WIN	WIN	SAFE	WIN	WINNERS
2	The Regulators	SAFE	SAFE	SAFE	WIN	WIN	SAFE	SAFE	SAFE	SAFE	SAFE	RUNNER-UP
3	Grading Curves	SAFE	SAFE	SAFE	SAFE	SAFE	LOW	HIGH	SAFE	WIN	OUT	
4	Slenderellas	SAFE	SAFE	SAFE	SAFE	SAFE	WIN	LOW	LOW	OUT		
5	Flabulous	SAFE	SAFE	LOW	SAFE	SAFE	HIGH	SAFE	OUT			
6	Double Chocolate	SAFE	LOW	SAFE	HIGH	SAFE	SAFE	OUT				
7	No Excuses	SAFE	SAFE	LOW	SAFE	SAFE	OUT					
8	Chicago Deep Dish	SAFE	SAFE	SAFE	SAFE	OUT						
9	A Pair of Nuts	SAFE	WIN	HIGH	OUT							
10	Rocker Moms	SAFE	SAFE	OUT								
11	Roll Models	SAFE	OUT									
12	Family Sized	OUT										

== Pounds Lost ==
Team	Starting Weight	Episodes										
Team	Starting Weight	1	2	3	4	5	6	7	8	9	10	Finale
Mission Slimpossible	508	-23	-1	-9	-19	-9	-9	+8	+5	-16	+5	-11
The Regulators	850	-34	-17	-18	-1	-7	-26	0	-11	-17	-11	-15
Grading Curves	502	-12	-14	-9	+1	-11	-7	+2	-14	-3	-4	
Slenderellas	615	-21	-13	-7	-2	-5	+5	-9	-9	-9		
Flabulous	653	-22	-7	-10	-5	-3	-3	-8	-2			
Double Chocolate	451	-13	-11	-4	-1	-5	-2	-6				
No Excuses	643	-24	-12	-12	-5	-11	-2					
Chicago Deep Dish	460	-21	-11	-5	-4	-2						
A Pair of Nuts	544	-15	-4	-9	-16							
Rocker Moms	476	-11	-9	-6								
Roll Models	478	-21	-9									
Family Sized	623	-11										
