= Ochocinco: The Ultimate Catch =

- Created by: Robert Horowitz; Lewis Fenton; Cris Abrego; Mark Cronin; Chad Ochocinco
- Directed by: Matt Bordofsky
- Starring: Chad Johnson
- Composers: Dan Radlauer; Jordan Browne; See Sound Music; Adam Zelkind
- Country of origin: United States
- No. of seasons: 1
- No. of episodes: 10

Production
- Executive producers: Robert Horowitz; Lewis Fenton; Cris Abrego; Mark Cronin; Chad Ochocinco; Ben Samek; Matt Odgers; Christian Sarabia; Jill Holmes; Kristen Kelly; Jeff Olde
- Running time: 60 minutes (including commercials)
- Production companies: 51 Minds Entertainment; Juma Entertainment

Original release
- Network: VH1
- Release: July 11 – September 5, 2010

Ochocinco: The Ultimate Catch is an American reality television series that aired on VH1 and starred NFL wide receiver Chad Johnson (then, Chad Ochocinco). The show placed him with 85 women to choose from. In the first episode of the show, he eliminated 69 girls. Rubi Pazmino was the winner of the show. Fellow NFL wide receivers, and Johnson's close friends, Bernard Berrian and Terrell Owens appeared on some episodes offering tips and helping Johnson select the girls.

== Contestants ==
Name	Ranking	Eliminated
Rubi	1	Winner
Brittany	11	Episode 10
Tiphani	6	Episode 9
Tara	2	Episode 9
Jasmine	13	Episode 7
Ericka	9	Episode 7
Courtney	3	Episode 6
Heather	7	Episode 6
April	5	Episode 5
Laurice	12	Episode 5
Lisa	10	Episode 4 (withdrew)^{[a]}
Candice	16	Episode 4
Crystal	14	Episode 3
Katie	15	Episode 3
Angela	4	Episode 2
Emma	8	Episode 2
Cynthia	N/A	Episode 1

^[a]In Episode 4, Lisa withdrew the competition to tend to her grandfather, who is terminally ill with cancer.

== Episode Progress ==
Sweet 16
1	Rubi	Won
16	Candice	Elim
8	Emma	Elim
9	Ericka	Won
3	Courtney	Won
14	Crystal	Elim
6	Tiphani	Won
11	Brittany	Won
2	Tara	Won
15	Katie	Elim
7	Heather	Pass
10	Lisa	Left
4	Angela	Elim
13	Jasmine	Won
5	April	Elim
12	Laurice	Elim

Elite 8
1	Rubi	Won
9	Ericka	Elim
3	Courtney	Elim
6	Tiphani	Won
2	Tara	Won
7	Heather	Elim
13	Jasmine	Elim
11	Brittany	Won

Final 4
1	Rubi	Won
6	Tiphani	Elim
2	Tara	Elim
11	Brittany	Pass

Championship
1	Rubi	Won
11	Brittany	Elim

Contestants	Episodes									
Contestants	1	2	3	4	5	6	7	8	9	10
Angela	Rubi (1)	Rubi	Rubi	Rubi	Rubi	Rubi	Rubi	Rubi	Rubi	Rubi
April	Tara (2)	Tara	Tara	Tara	Tara	Tara	Tara	Tara	Brittany	Brittany
Brittany	Courtney (3)	Courtney	Courtney	Courtney	Courtney	Tiphani	Tiphani	Tiphani	Tara	
Candice	Angela (4)	April	April	April	Tiphani	Ericka	Brittany	Brittany	Tiphani	
Courtney	April (5)	Tiphani	Tiphani	Tiphani	Heather	Brittany	Ericka			
Crystal	Tiphani (6)	Heather	Heather	Heather	Ericka	Jasmine	Jasmine			
Cynthia	Heather (7)	Ericka	Ericka	Ericka	Brittany	Courtney				
Emma	Emma (8)	Lisa	Lisa	Brittany	Jasmine	Heather				
Ericka	Ericka (9)	Brittany	Brittany	Laurice	April					
Heather	Lisa (10)	Laurice	Laurice	Jasmine	Laurice					
Jasmine	Brittany (11)	Jasmine	Jasmine	Lisa						
Katie	Laurice (12)	Crystal	Candice	Candice						
Laurice	Jasmine (13)	Katie	Crystal							
Lisa	Crystal (14)	Candice	Katie							
Rubi	Katie (15)	Emma								
Tara	Candice (16)	Angela								
Tiphani	Cynthia									

The contestant was Chad's Top Player.
The contestant is Chad's Ultimate Catch.
The contestant won the date and was safe.
The contestant was automatically safe.
The contestant was eliminated.
The contestant left the show.

- In episode 1, Chad ranked the girls 1–16 to set them up in a tournament style bracket.
- In episode 5, Chad eliminated both April and Laurice and kept both Tiphani and Brittany. Chad placed Brittany to compete with Jasmine in the second round.
- In episode 8, Chad did not eliminate any girl, taking all four of them to Miami.
- In episode 9, Chad eliminated Tara outside of elimination because she failed to be serious. Brittany was automatically moved to the Championship

== Episodes ==
No.	Title	Original release date	Prod. code	U.S. viewers (millions)
1	"Fielding His Team"	July 11, 2010	101	1.520
"NFL superstar Chad Ochocinco is known for his eccentric personality and wacky on-field antics. Now, he's looking for love. But of course, he's not going to do it like any ordinary person. He's going to do it bigger than it's ever been done before. Starting with eighty-five women to choose from, Chad is going to see if he can find his ultimate catch." - VH1: Top Player: Rubi; Eliminated: Cynthia; Reasons for Elimination: Cynthia: She was more focused on herself.
2	"Sweet 16"	July 18, 2010	102	0.776
"Sixteen ladies remain in the house as the battle for Ochocinco's heart truly begins. Divided into two teams of eight, the women must compete against their teammates to be the last one standing. The winners suddenly realize getting a date with Ocho can be a blessing and a curse. Tensions rise and hearts break as the ladies realize two of them must go home tonight!" - VH1: Eliminated: Emma, Angela; Reasons for Elimination: Emma: She was too shy and reserved.; Angela: She only has looks to show.
3	"Viva Las Ocho"	July 25, 2010	103	N/A
"Two lucky ladies take a gamble with Chad's heart in the entertainment capital of the world... Las Vegas! Chad must make a decision between two very different women, but at the end of an emotional deliberation, two girls are out... and the house is more divided than ever." - VH1: Eliminated: Crystal, Katie; Reasons for elimination: Crystal: Chad still doesn't know if he can trust her.; Katie: She has strong moral values that Chad may not adapt to.
4	"Gone Too Soon"	August 1, 2010	104	0.697
"It's down to 11 ladies and Chad is digging quite a few, it's anyone's game right now. Chad wants the girls to show him their personalities because getting a girl is the easy part, but getting one that's going to keep his interest, that's another story. One girl is totally blindsided in elimination and an emergency forces another girl to question if she should stay or go." - VH1: Eliminated: Candice; Quit: Lisa; Reasons for Elimination: Lisa: She left the show early because of a family emergency. She has to attend to her grandfather, who is terminally ill with cancer. She is automatically eliminated from the show.; Candice: She came off a little too strong.
5	"Airing Out the Laundry"	August 8, 2010	105	0.663
"It's Chad's biggest date yet, as he takes all 10 remaining ladies for a day of fun, sun, and football at the beach. Two lucky ladies are whisked away for a day in Beverly Hills, and Chad opens up about his past like he never has before. For his second date, Chad brings 2 ladies to one of his favorite places to spend his free time--a place no woman would ever expect." - VH1: Eliminated: April, Laurice; Reasons for Elimination: April: She tried too hard to impress him.; Laurice: She was not the same girl Chad knew, due to being influenced by Tara. She appeared uninterested in Chad during the date.
6	"It's Cold in Them Hills"	August 15, 2010	106	0.702
"We're down to Chad's Elite Eight. As this second half of the Tournament kicks off, Chad takes his girls on a mountain retreat to step back from the celebrity flash and show them the realer side of Chad Johnson. He opens his heart and reveals his past to find out which girls are ready to warm up and which are giving him the cold shoulder. Who will survive the cut when it's time to stop playing and start getting serious?" - VH1: Eliminated: Courtney, Heather; Reasons for Elimination: Courtney: Chad felt the connection with her is waning.; Heather: Chad felt Heather would still have trust issues with him.
7	"Winter Wonderland"	August 16, 2010	107	N/A
"Chad is down to six girls and the competition is getting ugly. Chad decides to treat his girls to some pampering at a posh Beverly Hills Salon for a day of beauty. While Chad whisks away two girls to a snowy winter wonderland, complete with a penguin, the other girls plot and plan their way to victory. With one last date before Chad makes his final decision, he whisks his final two matched girls to a tropical paradise themed date." - VH1: Eliminated: Ericka, Jasmine; Reasons for elimination: Ericka: Chad felt that their connection was fading, being under Tara's shadow.; Jasmine: Chad felt her personality changed, going from an outgoing personality to a more passive one to impress him.
8	"Analyze This"	August 22, 2010	108	0.710
"Chad brings the final four girls to Cincinnati, Ohio! Things turn hot and steamy on the solo date and Chad has a hard time making a decision. So to help him out, he's asked his longtime friend and sports psychologist to meet with each girl and get a good sense of who would best fit his lifestyle. After some in-depth analysis of each girl, one of the girls triggers a reaction from Chad that leads to an elimination unlike any other this season!" - VH1: Eliminated: No one; Notes: Chad found out from the psychologist that Tara is still not being serious and requested the video of Tara being interviewed by the psychologist.; Chad found out that Brittany's ex-husband might not approve Brittany herself to date Chad.
9	"Family Matters"	August 29, 2010	109	0.724
"Chad brings his final four girls to his hometown in Miami, Florida. Once there, the girls will have to impress some of Chad's most trusted friends and family. Tempers flare, and alliances are formed. In the end, two girls will go home, and only two will be left standing as Chad gets closer to determining who will be his ultimate catch." - VH1: Eliminated: Tara, Tiphani; Reasons for Elimination: Tara: Tara cannot be taken seriously at all that Chad eliminated her.; Tiphiani: Chad's family did not feel that she would be the best fit for Chad.
10	"Come Sail Away"	September 5, 2010	110	1.239
"Only two ladies remain in the final round to win Chad's affection. He continues to wine and dine both women on a romantic out of town trip. Chad must choose between fiery passion and a close mental connection. Will the underdog pull off an upset, or can the favorite take home the win? " - VH1: Eliminated: Brittany; Reasons for elimination: Brittany: Chad felt that there would be drama if he chose to be with Brittany, especially concerning her son.
