= Marrying the Game =

- Genre: Reality
- Starring: Jayceon Taylor; Tiffney Cambridge
- Country of origin: United States
- Original language: English
- No. of seasons: 3
- No. of episodes: 22

Production
- Executive producers: Ben Samek; Christian Sarabia; Cris Abrego; Jill Holmes; Kristen Kelly; Rabih Gholam
- Running time: 22 to 24 minutes
- Production company: 51 Minds Entertainment

Original release
- Network: VH1
- Release: November 19, 2012 – July 2, 2014

Marrying the Game is an American reality television series that aired on VH1 and premiered on November 19, 2012 and ended July 2, 2014.

== Premise ==
Marrying the Game chronicles the life of Jayceon Taylor, mostly known as The Game, and his fiancé Tiffney Cambridge. The couple dated for eight years, have two children together and were preparing to walk down the aisle. The second season follows the couple after Tiffney called off the wedding, moved out of the family home with their kids and as they work to fix their relationship.

== Cast ==
=== Main ===
- Jayceon Taylor / The Game, Rapper, record producer, entrepreneur, and actor
- Tiffney Cambridge, Elementary school teacher for 14 years and on/off fiancé to Jayceon

=== Supporting ===
- King "Justice" Taylor, Jayceon's and Tiffney's son
- Cali Dream Taylor, Jayceon's and Tiffney's daughter
- Harlem Caron Taylor, Jayceon's son from previous relationship
- Dontay Kidd, Jayceon's manager and best friend
- Maya Mellon, Tiffney's sister

== Episodes ==
=== Series overview ===
Season	Episodes	Originally released	
Season	Episodes	First released	Last released
1	6	November 19, 2012	December 17, 2012
2	8	August 5, 2013	September 16, 2013
3	8	May 7, 2014	July 2, 2014

=== Season 1 (2012) ===
No. overall	No. in season	Title	Original release date	U.S. viewers (millions)
1	1	"Know Your Man"	November 19, 2012	1.66
Tiffney becomes annoyed after Jayceon doesn't show up for the wedding walk-through due him working in the studio throughout the night.
2	2	"Sweet Rewards"	November 19, 2012	1.50
Jayceon begins to show Tiffney that he cares by becoming more involved with the planning of their wedding.
3	3	"Engagement Party Flop"	November 26, 2012	1.57
Tiffney and Jayceon decide to host an engagement party at their home with friends and family but the night takes a turn for the worse once drama erupts and feelings are hurt.
4	4	"France, Fights, and Fallouts"	December 3, 2012	1.82
Jayceon flies out to France but leaves Tiffney back at home. The couple's planned wedding venue doesn't work out, and on top of that, Jayceon doesn't call Tiffney for four days — which leaves her to question their relationship even more.
5	5	"Game Over: Part One"	December 10, 2012	1.64
Tiffney comes to the conclusion that she needs a break from the relationship, and puts the wedding on hold while moving out with the kids.
6	6	"Game Over: Part Two"	December 17, 2012	1.55
Tiffney and Jayceon continue to discuss her decision. Tiffney tells him that she wants time to think about what she really wants out of their relationship and where her future will go.

=== Season 2 (2013) ===
No. overall	No. in season	Title	Original release date	U.S. viewers (millions)
7	1	"Co-Parents"	August 5, 2013	2.88
In the season premiere, Tiffney and Jayceon have now been living apart for eight months but are still engaged. The couple are learning to co-parent and tone down the arguments.
8	2	"What Are We?"	August 12, 2013	2.99
Tiffney constantly texts Jayceon but he never replies so she decides to get help from a few people to get him to contact her. Later, Jayceon stops by Tiffney's apartment so the duo can discuss where their future is heading.
9	3	"Fresh Start"	August 19, 2013	2.12
With Father's Day approaching, Tiffney plans a party for Jayceon until they get into an argument — which puts the plans on hold. Jayceon plays a basketball game against NBA players with his son.
10	4	"Plan B"	August 26, 2013	1.85
Since Tiffney returned her engagement ring back to Jayceon, she takes the kids to Houston for a family reunion while Jayceon goes back to work. Tiffney ponders giving Jayceon a clean start or possibly finding another man.
11	5	"First Date"	September 2, 2013	1.70
Jayceon puts together a day for the family and a romantic date with Tiffney that brings their spark back.
12	6	"Team Work Makes The Dream Work"	September 9, 2013	1.62
After Jayceon put together the romantic date, Tiffney dedicates time doing what Jayceon likes to do.
13	7	"Home Sweet Home"	September 9, 2013	1.43
Tiffney and Jayceon talk things over breakfast when the topic of purchasing a family home comes up. Jayceon has a surprise birthday gift for Tiffney.
14	8	"Can I Marry The Game?"	September 16, 2013	1.74
After their first night together in almost a year, Tiffney and Jayceon reconnect over breakfast and discuss the possibility of getting a family home. Later, Jayceon has a birthday surprise for Tiffney.

=== Season 3 (2014) ===
No. overall	No. in season	Title	Original release date	U.S. viewers (millions)
15	1	"After the Fallout"	May 7, 2014	1.30
Four months after their trip to Cabo San Lucas, Tiffney and Jayceon's relationship has changed yet again.
16	2	"When Life Hands You Lemons, Make Patron Shots"	May 14, 2014	0.87
Tiffney wants to ease the children's minds by helping them adjust to splitting their time between parents. Jayceon gets come of his celebrity friends to donate to his charity.
17	3	"Step Up"	May 21, 2014	0.78
Jayceon promises Lolo a promotion if she can sell out a club so he can spend time with the kids. Tiffney asks her father for advice on how to tell the kids about her and Jayceon's breakup.
18	4	"When I Grow Up"	May 28, 2014	0.91
19	5	"Booking It"	June 4, 2014	0.93
20	6	"London Calling"	June 11, 2014	0.94
21	7	"The Rules of Swag"	June 25, 2014	N/A
22	8	"The End of the Game"	July 2, 2014	0.87
