= Real and Chance: The Legend Hunters =

- Created by: Cris Abrego; Mark Cronin
- Starring: Kamal Givens; Ahmad Givens
- Country of origin: United States
- No. of seasons: 1
- No. of episodes: 10

Production
- Executive producers: Cris Abrego; Mark Cronin; Ben Samek; Matt Odgers
- Production company: 51 Minds Entertainment

Original release
- Network: VH1
- Release: September 19 – November 24, 2010

Real and Chance: The Legend Hunters is an American reality television. The show premiered on VH1 on September 19, 2010, and consists of ten 60-minute episodes that aired through November 24, 2010.

== Overview ==
The program follows brothers Ahmad Givens, aka. Real, and Kamal Givens, aka. Chance, from VH1's Real Chance of Love, as they hunt for mythical creatures such as The Mega Shark, Bigfoot, and Hogzilla.

== Episodes ==
No.	Title	Original release date
1	"Lee's Monster"	September 19, 2010
Real and Chance traveled to Oklahoma where they're on the hunt for Lee's Monster, a legendary 130 pound catfish.
2	"The Shark Whisperer"	September 26, 2010
The Stallionaires sailed to the Bahamas to learn from Stuart Cove, a shark whisperer.
3	"Hogasaurus"	October 3, 2010
The boys head to Alabama in search of Hogasaurus, a legendary wild boar.
4	"Python"	October 13, 2010
Whiteboy joins Real and Chance in a quest for a monster python in the Florida Everglades.
5	"Wolf"	October 20, 2010
Real and Chance visit Lazy Lizard Ranch to learn about the wolf.
6	"Bigfoot"	October 27, 2010
The guys travel to the woods in Angeles National Forest to hunt the one and only Bigfoot.
7	"Cougar"	November 3, 2010
The Legend Hunters head to Hesperia, California to confront the cougar.
8	"Crocodile"	November 10, 2010
The boys travel to Costa Rica and go on a boat ride to search for a crocodile.
9	"Grizzly"	November 17, 2010
The Legend Hunter's next stop is at the Smoking Rock Ranch in Montana where they find out about a Grizzly bear called "Thunderclaw."
10	"Venom"	November 24, 2010
In the finale, The Legend Hunters travel to the Arenal Volcano in Costa Rica and meet up with Donald Schultz to collect venom samples from the three most deadliest creatures in the world.

== Reception ==
Common Sense Media gave the show three out of five stars, commenting that although some of the material in the show would be inappropriate for very young viewers, the show's hosts are "respectful toward the people they're learning from, but they still manage to hold on to their trademark bawdy sense of humor". A reviewer for Huffpost TV stated that the show's premise was "dopey" but that the show's concept was "inherently entertaining".
