= 51 Minds Entertainment =

American television production company

- Type: Subsidiary
- Industry: Television
- Genre: Reality television
- Predecessors: 51 Pictures; Mindless Entertainment; Authentic Entertainment
- Founded: 2004; 22 years ago
- Founders: Cris Abrego; Mark Cronin
- Headquarters: Los Angeles, California, United States
- Key people: Cris Abrego; Mark Cronin
- Products: Flavor of Love; Below Deck
- Number of employees: 200+ (2008)
- Parent: Endemol USA (2008–2015); Endemol Shine North America (2015–present)
- Website: bmp51.com

51 Minds Entertainment (or Fifty One Minds Entertainment) is a production company founded by Cris Abrego and Mark Cronin, that specializes in reality TV. It was created in 2004 as a merger between Cris Abrego's 51 Pictures (formerly Brass Ring Entertainment) and Mark Cronin's Mindless Entertainment.

The company is best known for producing the "celebreality" programs on VH1 (such as Flavor of Love, Rock of Love with Bret Michaels, Real Chance of Love, etc.) and other shows such as The Surreal Life, La La's Full Court Life, and the Below Deck franchise.

== History ==
In 2005, the company signed a two-year, seven series production deal with VH1. The company has been credited in helping revive VH1 ratings during this time. In 2008, the company was purchased by Endemol.

In 2009, after the Murder of Jasmine Fiore case, VH1 canceled Megan Wants a Millionaire and the third season of I Love Money, and 51 Minds was forced to reimburse VH1 for over $12 million in losses.

In 2010, the company branched out in Internet distributed programming, producing The Tester for the PlayStation Network. Other popular shows include Below Deck and their franchises on the NBCUniversal network Bravo.

In 2014, Cronin left the company to form Little Wooden Boat Productions, but still continued to work on shows by 51 Minds, such as Below Deck and Idiotest.

== Filmography ==
=== As 51 Minds Entertainment ===
==== 2000s ====
Title	Creator(s) / Developer(s)	Premiere date	End date	Network	Note(s)
The Surreal Life	Cris Abrego; Mark Cronin; Rick Telles	January 9, 2003	September 3, 2024	VH1	First television show created by the company. Credited as Mindless Entertainment for the first six seasons.
Strange Love	Cris Abrego; Mark Cronin	January 9, 2005	April 24, 2005	VH1	
My Fair Brady	Cris Abrego; Mark Cronin	September 11, 2005	March 9, 2008	VH1	
Flavor of Love	Cris Abrego; Mark Cronin	January 1, 2006	May 26, 2008	VH1	First reality dating "of Love" show created by the company.
Celebrity Paranormal Project	Cris Abrego; Mark Cronin	October 22, 2006	December 17, 2006	VH1	
I Love New York	Cris Abrego; Mark Cronin	January 8, 2007	January 6, 2008	VH1	Spin-off to Flavor of Love.
Charm School	Cris Abrego; Mark Cronin	April 15, 2007	July 27, 2009	VH1	
Rock of Love with Bret Michaels	Cris Abrego; Mark Cronin	July 15, 2007	April 19, 2009	VH1	
America's Most Smartest Model	Cris Abrego; Mark Cronin	October 7, 2007	December 16, 2007	VH1	
Gotti's Way	Cris Abrego; Mark Cronin	October 8, 2007	June 22, 2009	VH1	
I Love Money	Cris Abrego; Mark Cronin	July 6, 2008	December 1, 2010	VH1	
New York Goes to Hollywood	Cris Abrego; Mark Cronin	August 4, 2008	September 22, 2008	VH1	
From G's to Gents	Jamie Foxx	July 15, 2008	April 10, 2009	MTV	
Real Chance of Love	Cris Abrego; Mark Cronin	October 20, 2008	October 26, 2009	VH1	
Daisy of Love	Cris Abrego; Mark Cronin	April 26, 2009	July 26, 2009	VH1	First spin-off to Rock of Love with Bret Michaels.
New York Goes to Work	Cris Abrego; Mark Cronin	May 4, 2009	June 29, 2009	VH1	
Megan Wants a Millionaire	Cris Abrego; Mark Cronin	August 2, 2009	August 16, 2009	VH1	Second spin-off to Rock of Love with Bret Michaels.
For the Love of Ray J	Cris Abrego; Mark Cronin	February 2, 2009	February 8, 2010	VH1	

==== 2010s ====
Title	Creator(s) / Developer(s)	Premiere date	End date	Network	Note(s)
Frank the Entertainer in a Basement Affair	Cris Abrego; Mark Cronin	January 3, 2010	March 28, 2010	VH1	Spin-off to I Love New York and I Love Money.
The Tester	Sony Computer Entertainment	February 18, 2010	April 3, 2012	PlayStation Network	
Brandy & Ray J: A Family Business	Cris Abrego; Mark Cronin; Ray J	April 11, 2010	February 27, 2011	VH1	
Ochocinco: The Ultimate Catch	Bob Horowitz; Lewis Fenton; Cris Abrego; Mark Cronin; Chad Ochocinco	July 11, 2010	September 5, 2010	VH1	
Money Hungry	Cris Abrego; Ellen Rakieten	August 2, 2010	October 4, 2010	VH1	
Real and Chance: The Legend Hunters	Cris Abrego; Mark Cronin	September 19, 2010	November 24, 2010	VH1	
La La's Full Court Wedding	Cris Abrego; Mark Cronin	September 19, 2010	October 24, 2010	VH1	
Bret Michaels: Life as I Know It	Bret Michaels; Cris Abrego; Mark Cronin	October 18, 2010	December 20, 2010	VH1	Third spin-off to Rock of Love with Bret Michaels.
Mario Lopez: Saved by the Baby	Cris Abrego; Mark Cronin	November 1, 2010	January 3, 2011	VH1	
Bridalplasty	Cris Abrego; Mark Cronin	November 28, 2010	January 30, 2011	E!	
Same Name	Cris Abrego; Mark Cronin	July 24, 2011	August 14, 2011	CBS	
Famous Food	Cris Abrego; Mark Cronin	July 10, 2011	September 7, 2011	VH1	
Ton of Cash	Cris Abrego; Mark Cronin	August 17, 2011	October 26, 2011	VH1	
La La's Full Court Life	La La Anthony; Cris Abrego; Steven Grossman	August 22, 2011	July 2, 2014	VH1	Spin-off of La La's Full Court Wedding.
Scouted	Cris Abrego; Mark Cronin	November 28, 2011	January 16, 2012	E!	
T.I. & Tiny: The Family Hustle	Brian Sher; Cris Abrego; Stella Bulochnikov	December 5, 2011	May 29, 2017	VH1	
Redneck Island	Steve Austin	June 9, 2012	March 31, 2016	CMT	
Marrying the Game	Jayceon Taylor; Tiffany Clambridge	November 19, 2012	July 2, 2014	VH1	
Ghost Mine	Mark Cronin	January 16, 2013	November 20, 2013	Syfy	
Whodunnit?	Anthony E. Zuiker	June 23, 2013	August 18, 2013	ABC	
Below Deck	Mark Cronin	July 1, 2013	present	Bravo	Second longest-running show franchise by the company.
Mind of a Man	Mark Cronin	January 8, 2014	May 14, 2014	Game Show Network	
Steve Austin's Broken Skull Challenge	Cris Abrego; Steve Austin; Jack Heller	July 6, 2014	December 19, 2017	CMT	In co-production with Broken Skull Productions.
Sisterhood of Hip Hop	T.I.	August 12, 2014	September 13, 2016	VH1	
Follow the Rules	Ja Rule	October 26, 2015	December 7, 2015	MTV	
Below Deck Mediterranean	Mark Cronin	May 3, 2016	present	Bravo	
Truck Night in America	Christian Sarabia; James Patrick Costello II	March 18, 2018	March 28, 2019	History Channel	
The Grand Hustle	T.I.	July 20, 2018	October 4, 2018	BET	
T.I. & Tiny: Friends & Family Hustle	T.I. Tameka Cottle; Brian Sher	October 22, 2018	June 29, 2020	VH1	

==== 2020s ====
Title	Creator(s) / Developer(s)	Premiere date	End date	Network	Note(s)
Below Deck Sailing Yacht	Mark Cronin	February 3, 2020	present	Bravo	
Married to Real Estate	Egypt Sherrod; Mike Jackson	January 13, 2022	May 28, 2025	HGTV	
Below Deck Down Under	Mark Cronin	March 17, 2022	present	Bravo	Aired on Peacock for its first season.
Hack My Home	Ming Lee Howell	July 7, 2023		Netflix	
