= Cris Abrego =

American television producer, writer

Cris Abrego is an American television producer, writer, and former CEO of Endemol Shine North America. Abrego is now the Chairman of Banijay America Group and president and CEO of Endemol Shine Holdings.

== Early life ==
Abrego grew up in El Monte, California. He was a wrestler at California State University, Fullerton before graduating and moving to Los Angeles to work on reality television shows.

== Career ==
After graduation from Mountain View High School, Abrego attended California State University, Fullerton. After graduation, he joined Bunim-Murray, working on The Real World and Road Rules television shows. While working for Bunim-Murray, Abrego freelanced as a coordinating producer for Fear and Making the Band. In addition, he was the co-creator and executive producer for a reality version of the movie The Cannonball Run.

In 2002, Abrego created Brass Ring; a production company responsible for Next Action Star, Surf Girls and The Hitchhiker Chronicles. Soon after, he created 51 Pictures.

In 2003, Abrego's 51 Pictures merged with Mark Cronin's Mindless Entertainment to form 51 Minds Entertainment. The two met through Abrego's agent. Together, they created The Surreal Life for the WB network. Soon after, the team created a string of "Celebreality" shows for VH1, including Strange Love, My Fair Brady, The Surreal Life Fame Games, Celebrity Paranormal Project, Flavor of Love, I Love New York, New York Goes to Hollywood, Flavor of Love Girls: Charm School, Rock of Love with Bret Michaels, I Love Money, America's Most Smartest Model, Rock of Love Girls: Charm School 2, La La's Full Court Life, Real Chance of Love, For the Love of Ray J, Daisy of Love, Megan Wants a Millionaire, and Bridal Plasty.

In 2014, Abrego became co-chairman and co-CEO of Endemol North America along with Charlie Corwin. In January 2016, he was named Co-Chairman, Endemol Shine Americas. In November 2016, Abrego became CEO of Endemol Shine North America, and Chairman of Endemol Shine Americas.
