= Vas o No Vas =

Vas o No Vas is the name of Deal or No Deal used in a few Spanish-speaking countries, including:

- Vas o No Vas (Mexican game show)
- Vas o No Vas (American game show)
- Vas O No Vas (Peruvian game show)
