= Stephanie Arnold (author) =

American producer and author

Stephanie Arnold (born July 7, 1971) is an American producer and author. In 2013, she was clinically dead for 37 seconds after suffering an amniotic fluid embolism (AFE) immediately after giving birth to her second child. On September 15, 2015 Arnold published a book, 37 Seconds, about the event and her life afterwards. The book has since been translated into several languages. Her cousin, Sari Padorr also collaborated on her book. It was said that she predicted her flatlining and details of how it would happen before it happened and stunned doctors with how, during her time clinically dead, she was able to tell them exact details about what was happening around her, when she was resuscitated. She had told family members months before that this would happen but nobody believed her.

== Personal life ==
In May 2013, Stephanie Arnold suffered a rare, and often fatal, condition called an amniotic fluid embolism after giving birth to her second child and she died on the operating table. Arnold later covered this, along with the events before and after her clinical death in her 2015 book.

Arnold is married to PhD economist (University of Chicago) Jonathan Arnold, with whom she has three children.

== Career ==
After graduation, Arnold worked for Higher Authority Productions in Miami, producing Jewish educational documentaries. She then formed her own production company called Fisch Food Productions, Inc., where she held many roles including an executive producer for 14 years. Along with Fisch Food, she co-founded Busby, an invitation-only social network, where entertainment and media professional showcase, connect, and flourish. Throughout her career Stephanie produced television programs and music videos with the likes of Sarah Jessica Parker & Chris Noth (New York Magazine Award Show), Marc Anthony (Puerto Rican Day Parade) and Julio Iglesias (Baila Morena). In 1995, Arnold was nominated for a Premio Lo Nuestro for her direction in Olga Tañón’s Tu Amor video. Because of her work with music, she also served as a board member on the Florida chapter of the Grammys.

Arnold produced other reality television programs including Elite Model’s Look of the Year. She co-created and executive produced a show called Latin Access, the first nationally syndicated entertainment magazine television program focusing on Hispanic content in English. The show aired on the NBC owned and operated stations, along with many affiliates throughout the country. Throughout her career, she also served as Vice President of Development for the Production Company responsible for Surreal Life, Mindless Entertainment. In addition to Mindless, she was Senior Vice President of Development for Galan Entertainment, a Latin media company. Later, in the fall of 2003 Arnold was hired by the production company Endemol to launch their US Hispanic division. During her time there, she ran the show and executive produced Vas or No Vas for Telemundo.

Today, Stephanie Arnold currently serves on the board of directors for the AFE Foundation, and was named one of Today’s Chicago Woman’s 100 Women of Inspiration, and speaks on patient advocacy to organizations like The American Society of Anesthesiologist and featured in their campaign "When Seconds Count". She talks to clinicians and students at the Association of Women's Health Obstetrics and Neonatal Nurses (AWHONN). She has worked with University of Chicago (Divinity and Medical School), groups at the Department of Defense, Chicago Ideas Week, and has raised money for Northwestern Memorial Hospital's Prentice Women's Hospital. She was also the focus of the Mothers of May campaign for LifeSource Blood Donation Services.

37 Seconds is Stephanie Arnold's first book. It is a book about survival, premonitions, intuition, the past, the present, and the future. A true-life story of survival and how dying revealed Heaven's help. The book has won several awards including The Reader's Favorite Gold Medal and became a National Bestseller.

== Bibliography ==
- 37 Seconds (2015)
