= Leyla Milani =

Iranian-Canadian-American model and actress

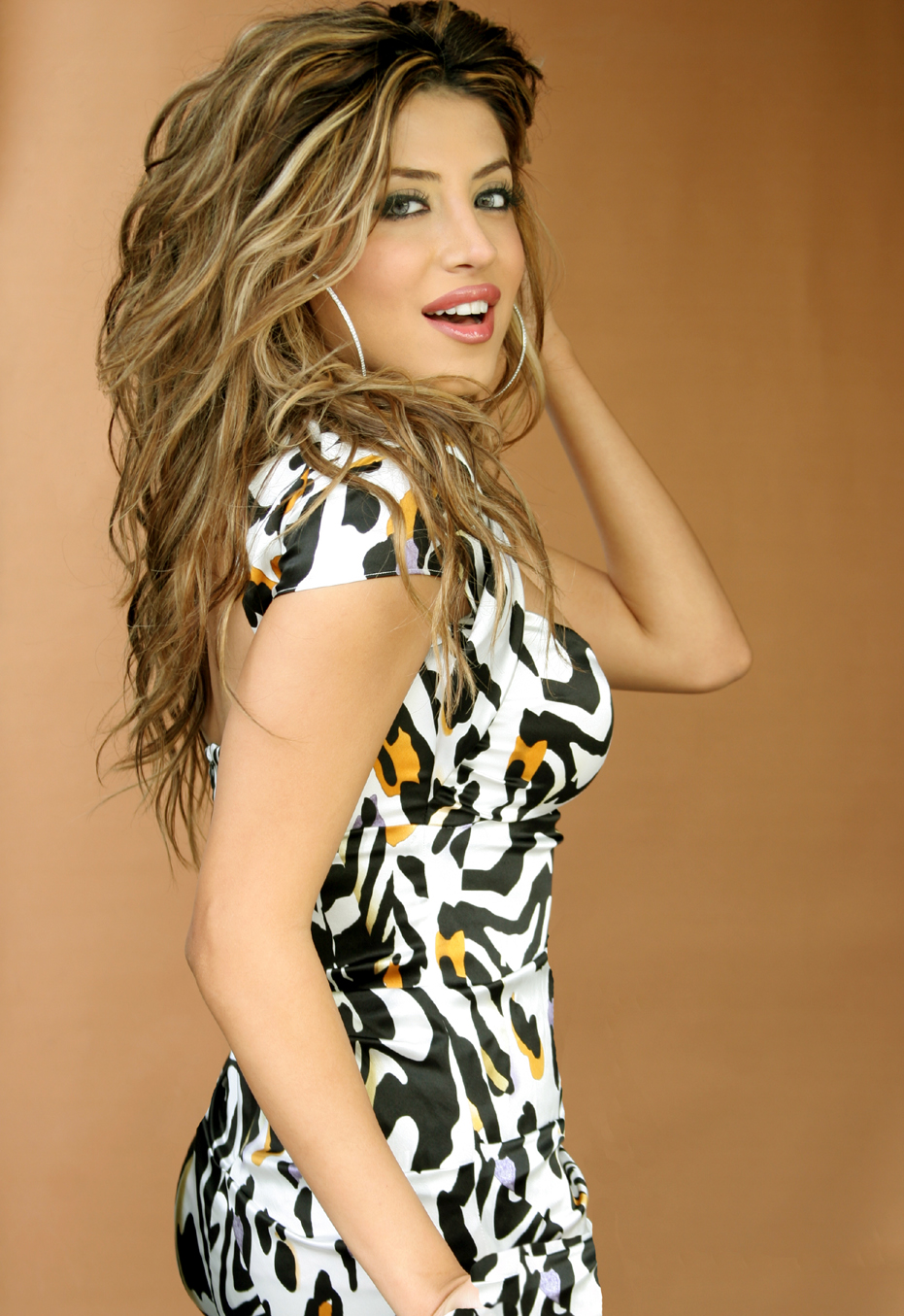
- Milani in 2007
- Born: April 2, 1982 (age 44); Tehran, Iran
- Occupations: Instagram influencer, former actress, model, and television host
- Years active: 2002–present
- Spouse: Manuchehr Khoshbin (m. 2011)
- Children: 2

Leyla Milani Khoshbin (born April 2, 1982) is an Iranian-Canadian former model, television host, and retired actress who is now an Instagram influencer. Milani was born in Iran and moved to Toronto, Ontario, Canada, at the age of four.

Leyla has appeared in the 2005 WWE Diva Search, Deal or No Deal, Sleeper Cell, Las Vegas, Rules of Engagement, Attack of the Show!, Curb Your Enthusiasm, Entourage, Stacked, Desire, Wanted, The Tonight Show with Jay Leno, Extra, and the 2006 Lingerie Bowl. She has also appeared in the films Wrestlemaniac and Dr. Chopper. Maxim magazine features Milani and her fellow Deal or No Deal briefcase models in their online Girls of Maxim gallery.

== Professional wrestling career ==
Milani was a contestant in the 2005 WWE Diva Search, finishing second out of 8,000 contestants worldwide. Following that, she made an appearance at Pro Wrestling Guerrilla After School Special. After appearing in the WWE Diva Search, she began using the stage name Leyla Milani.

She later appeared on one of the USA Network's WWE Raw Fan Nation commercials, which are a series of commercials advertising WWE Raw, featuring people ranging from a stockbroker to Snoop Dogg.

Milani is the former co-host of Jimmy Hart's all-women wrestling show, Wrestlicious TakeDown which debuted March 1, 2010. She was replaced by Brooke Lynn on the March 31, 2010, episode, because of scheduling conflicts.

== Deal or No Deal (2005–2009) ==
Milani was a model on NBC's prime-time game show Deal or No Deal from 2005 to 2009. She was best known for her "lioness-like" mane and held case #13 since the beginning of the show. Although 13 is usually considered the unluckiest of numbers, she was often referred to on the show as "Lucky Leyla" or "Lucky 13," as many times her case contained 6-digit amounts and in eight instances contained the $1,000,000 top prize. Nonetheless, NBC once opened the show noting that by holding all the large amounts and not being picked at the beginning, case #13 was very unlucky during most of the first season. On at least one occasion during the second season, case #13 contained a seven-figure prize.

Milani and her fellow Deal or No Deal models won a Game Show Network Award for "Favorite TV Models." On June 6, 2009, Milani and four other models accepted this award on GSN. Deal or No Deal also won The People's Choice Award two years in a row for Favorite Game Show.

She was one of a handful of models chosen to make a special appearance on The Oprah Winfrey Show. Oprah picked Leyla's case (number 8 for this show). Oprah later chanted Leyla's name as her dog's name is also Leyla.

Milani made an appearance on the Style Network's show, Split Ends, and on a celebrity episode of GSN's game show Catch 21, alongside fellow DOND models Patricia Kara and Marisa Petroro. She announced on this show the launch of her own hair extension line, Milani Hair, which launched in early 2010.

== Other appearances ==
Milani has made multiple appearances on the Fox News' conservative satire show The Half Hour News Hour, and Redeye as a celebrity looking for a charity to support. She hosted FOX Sport Net's Celebrity Golf tournament as well as Fuel TV'S motorsport show, M80. Milani made a cameo appearance on LOGO channel series Noah's Arc as a woman applying for a job. She has also appeared on MTV's True Life: I'm A TV Star, and My Fair Brady.

Milani appeared in an online comedy web series for Experian Credit alongside comedian Pauly Shore; she played a bride-to-be with bad credit. Other stars who appeared on this web series included Vivica A. Fox, Michael Madsen and Danny Glover.

She is in the independent horror film Wrestlemaniac, where she plays "Dallas", and the docu-comedy Boys & Girls Guide to Getting Down where she plays "Brittany", the "Westside Persian".

She made an appearance on an episode of NBC's Last Comic Standing and Phenomenon. She was also a referee in the 2006 Lingerie Bowl. Milani is featured in the December 8, 2012, TLC special titled Secrets of a Trophy Wife.

== Milani Hair ==
In 2009, Milani founded Leyla Milani Hair, a luxury haircare company specializing in "premium, 100% human hair clip-in extensions," citing Milani's own hair woes as the company's inspiration. Based in Irvine, California, the company is part of Kosh Milani Enterprises LLC. As of 2009, the company was known to have five employees.

== See also ==
- List of Iranian women models and beauty pageant titleholders
