= Sign Guy =

American wrestling fan

Rick Achberger (1972 – September 27, 2026), also known as Sign Guy, was an American fan of WWE. He regularly attended WWE events sitting in the front row, holding up unique signs supporting the faces and insulting the heels. He died in September 2026.

== Life ==
Born in Dallas, Texas, Achberger started attending World Wrestling Federation (later renamed WWE) events in the late 1990s. He would often sit in the front row wearing a distinctive red hat and blue shirt whilst also holding up several home-made signs. He would often interact with the WWE wrestlers, with them responding by ripping signs or pouring water on him. By 2007, he estimated he had attended over 1,000 WWE events. He also appeared on Deal or No Deal, winning $106,000 whilst WWE wrestlers Edge, Randy Orton, John Cena and Bobby Lashley watched from the audience. Despite being popular with the wrestlers, later WWE officials would often move him from his front row seats and move him outside of main camera shots. When he stopped regularly attending events, he would provide opinions on WWE to news channels.

He died in 27th September 2026, the cause of death was not revealed. Several WWE wrestlers paid tribute to him. A celebration of his life was celebrated months after his death.
