= Como dice el dicho =

Mexican anthology drama television series

- Genre: Anthology series
- Created by: Vittoria Zarattini; José Antonio Olvera
- Directed by: Emmanuel Duprez
- Starring: Sergio Corona; Wendy González; Michael Ronda; Brisa Carrillo; Benny Emmanuel; Héctor Sandarti; Fernanda Sasse; Héctor Sandarti; Pepe Valdivieso; Nuria Gil; Omar Fierro
- Opening theme: "Como dice el dicho" by Mané de la Parra and Mario Bautista
- Country of origin: Mexico
- Original language: Spanish
- No. of seasons: 14
- No. of episodes: 1120 (list of episodes)

Production
- Executive producer: Genoveva Martínez
- Production locations: Mexico City, Mexico
- Running time: 60 minutes approx.
- Production company: Televisa

Original release
- Network: Las Estrellas
- Release: 1 February 2011 – 31 January 2025

Related
- La rosa de Guadalupe

Como dice el dicho (translation: As the saying goes) is a Mexican anthology drama series produced by Genoveva Martínez for Televisa. The series premiered on 1 February 2011, on Las Estrellas.

The series covers a variety of stories in which a proverb (usually of Mexican origin) is selected for each episode and applied to real-life situations such as family violence, economic crisis, personal growth, the dignity of women, homosexuality, and drug addiction, among others.

In November 2024, the series was canceled after fourteen seasons. The last episode aired on 31 January 2025.

== Plot ==
The series is set in present-day Mexico City, mostly at a café named "Café El Dicho" owned by Don Tomás, who is helped by his granddaughter Isabel and his employees. Episodes usually center around the customers who, most of the time, are dealing with a problem. Throughout the episode a proverb is written in one of the white walls of the café, either by Don Tomás, one of his employees, or by a customer. The saying that is written usually describes the situation of what is happening in the particular moment it is written.

== Production ==
=== Filming ===
Unlike many Televisa productions, Como dice el dicho is filmed on location in various parts of Mexico City. Six episodes are shot per week; two episodes are filmed simultaneously. The coffee shop scenes in Season 1 and the first episodes of Season 2 were filmed in the colonia Condesa in the borough of Cuauhtémoc. Since Season 2, coffee shop scenes have been filmed in the colonia Anzures in the borough of Miguel Hidalgo. The crew usually films at the coffee shop once or twice a week. The first two episodes of the fourth season were filmed in Zacatlán, Puebla, which was the first time the series filmed episodes outside of Mexico City. The first two episodes of the fifth season were filmed in ultra-high-definition 4K resolution.

=== Music ===
The series' original theme song is called "Como dice el dicho". It is performed by Mexican singer Mané de la Parra in Seasons 1 and 3. The same theme song is used for Season 2 but is performed by singer Jass Reyes. For season 4 a new song performed by Marco Di Mauro was used as the show's theme; this song is also called "Como dice el dicho". For seasons 5 and 6 the original theme song returned and was performed by Mané de la Parra and Margarita Vargas. For season 7, the song is performed by de la Parra and the Mexican band La Original Banda El Limón. In season 8 the song is performed by de la Parra and Mario Bautista.

=== Cancelation ===
On 6 November 2024, it was announced that TelevisaUnivision had canceled the series after fourteen seasons, with the final episode being filmed the next day. The decision was the result of economic issues in Mexico, leading TelevisaUnivision to announce a 25 percent staff reduction. The cancellation was abrupt and sudden and came as preparations were already underway for a fifteenth season.

== Cast ==
Actor	Character	Season												
Actor	Character	1	2	3	4	5	6	7	8	9	10	11	12	13
Sergio Corona	Tomás León	Main	Main	Main	Main	Main	Main	Main	Main	Main	Main	Main	Main	Main
Wendy González	Isabel León	Main	Main	Main	Main		Flashback							
Michael Ronda	Poncho	Recurring	Main	Main	Main	Recurring								
Brisa Carrillo	Marieta				Recurring	Main	Main	Main	Main	Main	Main	Main		
Benny Emmanuel	Pato					Main	Main	Main	Main	Main	Main	Main	Flashback	
Fernanda Sasse	Lupita						Main	Main	Main					
Héctor Sandarti	Ramón León	Guest	Guest		Guest		Main	Main						
Pepe Valdivieso	Pepe									Main	Main	Main	Main	Main
Nuria Gil	Nuria												Main	Main
Omar Fierro	Pedro Quivera												Main	Main

== Awards and nominations ==
=== Premios TVyNovelas ===
Year	Category	Result
2013	Best Unit Program	Nominated
2014	Best Unit Program	Nominated
2015	Best Unit Program	Won
2016	Best Unit Program	Won
2017	Best Unit Program	Won
2018	Best Unit Program	Nominated
2019	Best Unit Program	Nominated
2020	Best Unit Program	Nominated
