= Lisa Gleave =

Australian glamour model (b.1976)

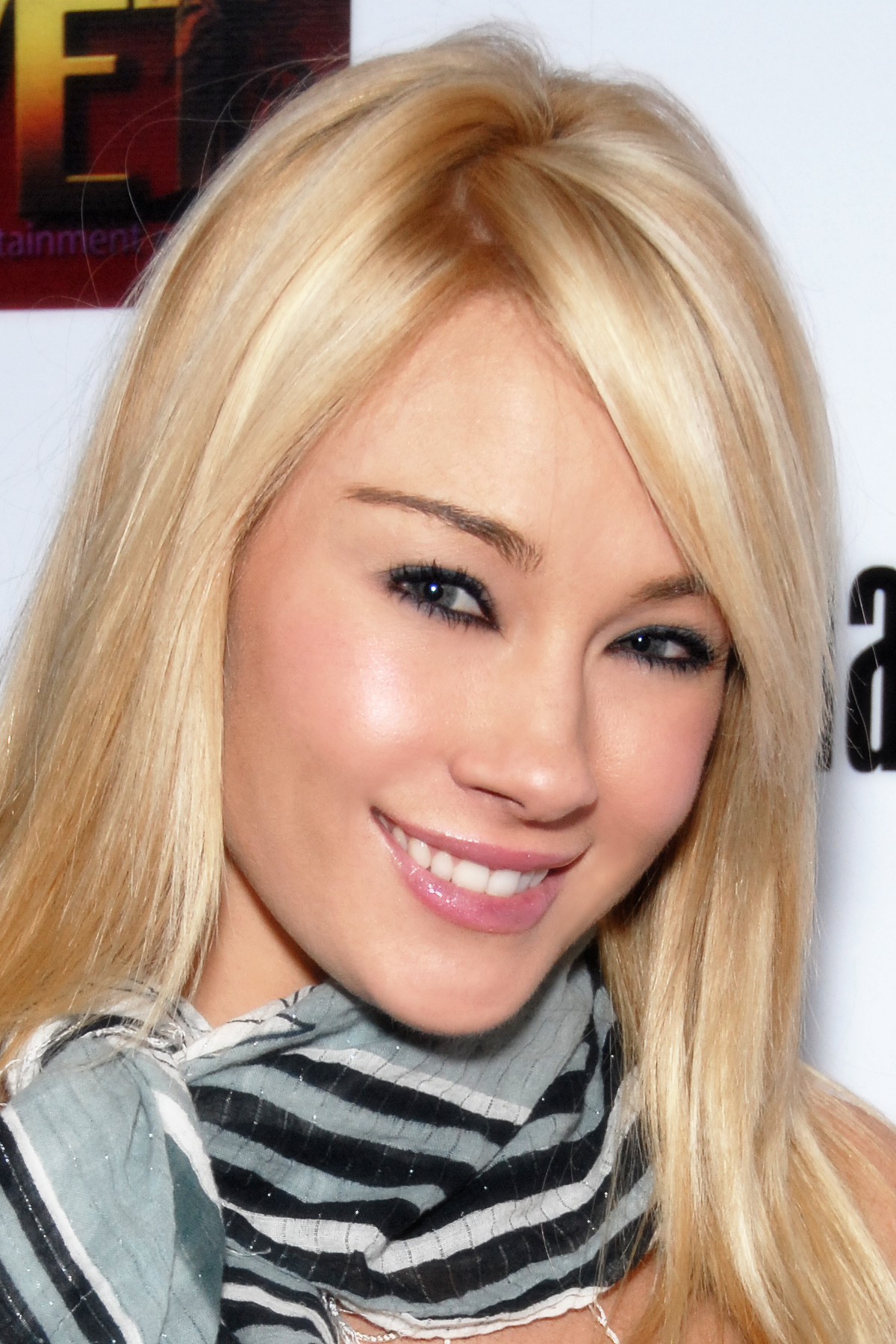
- Gleave in 2008
- Born: November 11, 1976 (age 49); Surfers Paradise, Queensland, Australia
- Modeling information
- Height: 5 ft 7 in (1.70 m)
- Hair color: Blonde
- Eye color: Green

Lisa Gleave (born November 11, 1976) is an Australian-American glamour model and TV personality, known for her work as a Barker's Beauty on The Price Is Right and as a model on the show Deal or No Deal.

== Early life ==
Born in Queensland, Australia, Gleave moved to the United States in 2000 to pursue her dream in modeling and fashion.

== Career ==
During 2005–2009, she was a model on the game show Deal or No Deal, where she always held the number 3 briefcase. She has also had roles in Accepted and CSI: NY. She is an E3 booth babe for Tecmo. Gleave is the cover model for the 2006 Maxim calendar and has been featured in Maxim and FHM.

Gleave is also the spokesperson for the travel website IC Places.

== Filmography ==
=== Films ===
- One With The Gun Paintball Training (2007) – Splat girl
- Accepted (2006) – Kiki's Best Friend #1
- Bald (2008) – Shirtless Cynthia
- Deep In The Valley (2009) – Officer Britney Speared
- Date Night (2010)
- Night Of The Templar (2010) – Ashley

=== Television shows ===
- The Price Is Right (2002–2003) – Model
- Spike Video Game Awards (2003) – Trophy Presenter
- Reno 911! (2005) – Tammy
- CSI: NY (2006) – Jennifer Fazotti
- Deal or No Deal (2005–2009) – Model #3
- Super Dave's Spike Tacular (2009) – Beautiful Girl
- Tosh.0 (2010) – Bachelorette for the weekly web redemption.

=== Magazine covers ===
- 21 Magazine (Fall 2006) – Jr. Cover Model
