= Patricia Kara =

American model, tv personality (b. 1972)

- Kara in pre-2009 publicity photo
- Born: Patricia Karamouzis; February 25, 1972 (age 54); Chicago, Illinois, U.S.
- Occupations: Actress, model, TV personality
- Years active: 2000–present
- Website: www.patriciakara.com

Patricia Kara (Greek: Panayiota Karamouzis-Παναγιώτα Καραμούζη; born February 25, 1972) is an American model, TV personality and former actress.

== Career ==
She began her career in Chicago, before moving to Miami, New York City, then to Los Angeles. As of 2006, she had done segments for the TV Guide Channel's coverage of the Golden Globes, the Catherine Zeta-Jones benefit for the Motion Picture and Television Fund, and the E! Network's Wild On! series (the Kentucky Derby episode). She was also a Spring Break VJ in Lake Havasu and Panama City Beach.

Prior to 2011, she appeared in television commercials for Coors Light, Old Navy, Bally Total Fitness, Kohl's, Ericsson and V8.

From 2000 to 2009, Kara worked as an actor, making 14 credited and minor uncredited appearances in feature films, short films, television series, music videos or video games. These include her first appearance in 2000 in a skit on an episode of MADtv, a 2005 role as 'Sexy Shopper' on an episode of Las Vegas, a recurring role (seven appearances over 2002–2003) as the nameless 'Alistair's Assistant' on the daytime soap opera Passions, and ending with a 2009 episode of the soap opera Days of Our Lives.

Kara's modeling career includes print advertisements for AT&T, FedEx, Venus Swimwear, Disney, Suave, Swiffer, 24 Hour Fitness and Snickers. She has appeared in magazines, including Stuff, Maxim, Sports Illustrated, Cosmopolitan, Glamour, Redbook, Shape and Fitness.

In 2005, she was chosen to be a model on NBC's game show Deal or No Deal. She and Tameka Jacobs were the assistants for the syndicated version of the show from 2008 until its cancellation in 2010.

Kara appeared on a Celebrity Edition of the GSN game show Catch 21, playing for charity alongside fellow Deal or No Deal models Leyla Milani and Marisa Petroro. Kara won the main game, earning $1,500 (with a $500 bonus for getting the show's first "21") and an additional $1,000 in the Bonus Game, for a total of $2,500.

In 2018, Kara returned to Deal or No Deal, once again as the model for case #9. She and Megan Abrigo were the only models to appear in all five seasons of the show and also appear in the CNBC 2018 revival.
