= Adrianne Curry =

American fashion model (born 1982)

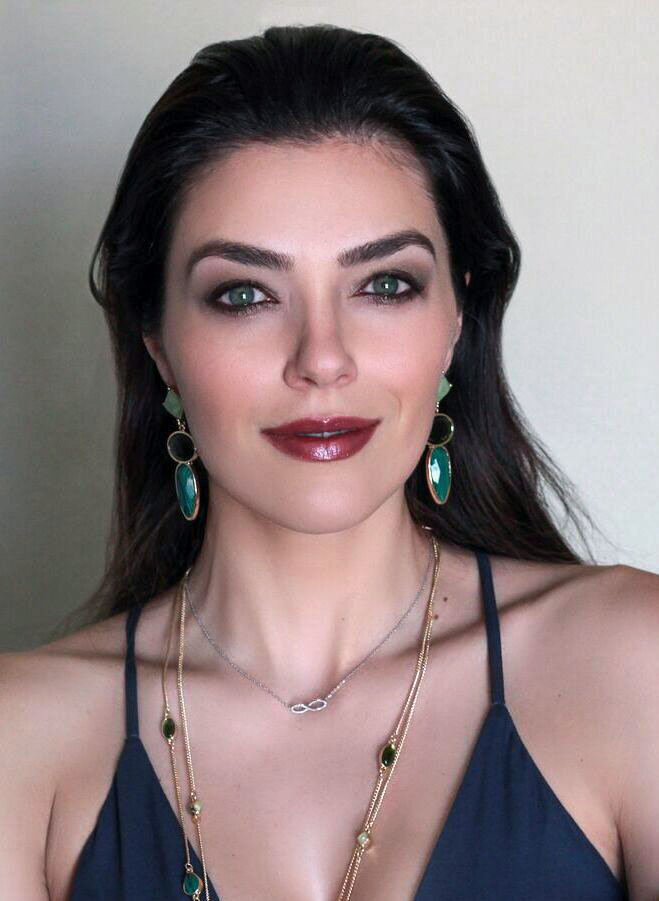
- Curry in May 2018
- Born: Adrianne Marie Curry; August 6, 1982 (age 44); Joliet, Illinois, U.S.
- Occupations: Model; television personality; spokeswoman; actress
- Years active: 2003–2015
- Height: 5 ft 11 in (180 cm)
- Spouses: Christopher Knight (m. 2006; div. 2013); Matthew Rhode (m. 2018)

Adrianne Marie Curry-Rhode (born August 6, 1982) is an American fashion model, actress and television personality. She is best known as the winner of the first cycle of America's Next Top Model in 2003.

== Career ==
=== Modeling ===
Curry won the first cycle of America's Next Top Model. In later interviews, Curry said that she did not receive the full prize package described during the competition. She stated that the Revlon component amounted to a paid makeup demonstration rather than a campaign. A former Wilhelmina vice president told ''Entertainment Weekly'' that the agency had different owners and staff at the time and questioned whether it would have had an incentive to limit her work. Wilhelmina Models deteriorated after the series changed agencies for its second cycle. She was signed to Wilhelmina Models in New York City. She has modeled for several magazines, including Life & Style, Us Weekly, Star, OK!, Stuff, People, Maxim (and made the Maxim Hot 100 list in 2005), Spanish Marie Claire, Von Dutch, Von Dutch Watches, Salon City, Macy's, Famous Stars and Straps, Lucky, Ed Hardy, Kinis Bikinis, Beverly Hills Choppers, and Merit Diamonds. Curry's runway shows include Anne Bowen Spring 2005, Jaime Pressly, Pamela Anderson's line, Ed Hardy, Von Dutch, and Christopher Deane. She has appeared in a commercial for the Merit Diamonds Sirena Collection that ran from November 2004 to January 2006. She appeared on the cover and in a nude pictorial for the American edition Playboy in February 2006. She returned for a second cover and nude pictorial in the January 2008 issue. Curry made Playboy's 2008 top 25 sexiest women, along with the top 100 Playboy spreads 2008 edition.

=== Television and film ===
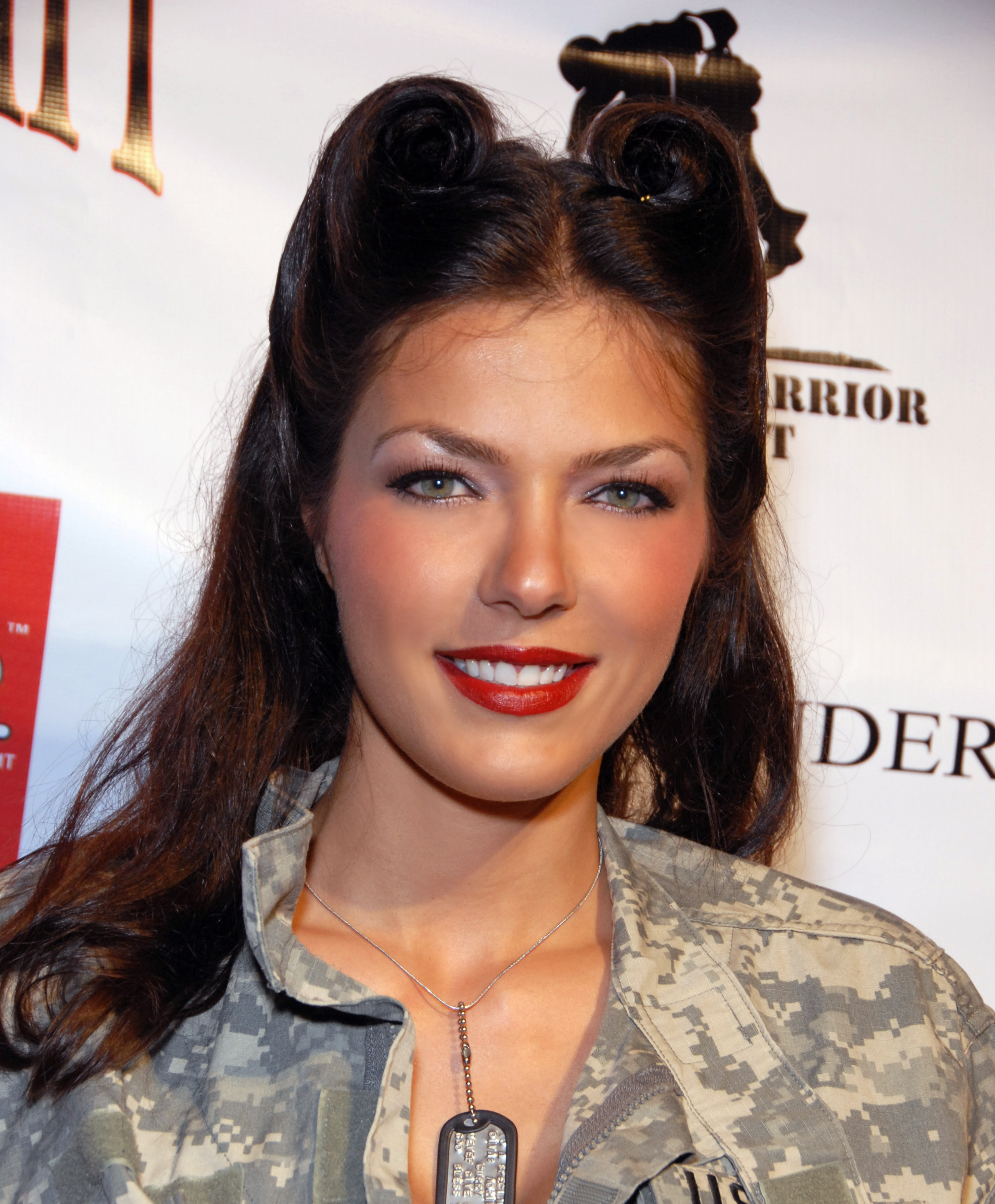
Curry in May 2009

In early 2005, Curry appeared on VH1's fourth season of The Surreal Life. After the season ended, Curry and fellow house guest Knight began dating, and later moved in together. On September 11, 2005, VH1 began airing My Fair Brady, a show that documented their life together and paid her an estimated US$450,000. The show led her to being featured in Maxim's Hot 100, a list of the "hottest" women on earth and ranked #100 on the Maxim Hot 100 Women of 2005.

Curry was a co-host on the television game show Ballbreakers. In 2006, she appeared on Gameshow Marathon as a celebrity panelist on the Match Game episode. She starred in "Rock Me Baby" (2004) and Half & Half (2003) on UPN. Curry also appeared on Dirt starring Courteney Cox, with whom she shared scenes. She appeared in rock band's The Click Five music video "Just the Girl", along with husband Christopher Knight. Curry appeared on VH1's celeb science fiction reality show Celebrity Paranormal Project in 2006, along with her husband, and on WE TV's From Russia with Love that documented her trip to Russia and aired November 2007. She has also starred in the films Fallen Angels, Light Years Away and "Jack Rio."

Season 3 of My Fair Brady began airing on January 21, 2008, and focused on Curry's breast enhancement surgery and Knight's competing (and contrary) desire to start a family. In June 2008, Curry and her family and friends appeared on NBC's Celebrity Family Feud. Between November and December 2010, Curry worked as the "Resident Celebrity Gamer" panelist judge on the second series of The Tester, a reality program on the PlayStation Network. She returned to the panel for the third series which began on February 7, 2012. Curry hosted live coverage of BlizzCon for DirecTV in 2011, as well as Hosting live from E3 for Bandai Namco Entertainment in both 2011 and 2012.

== Personal life ==
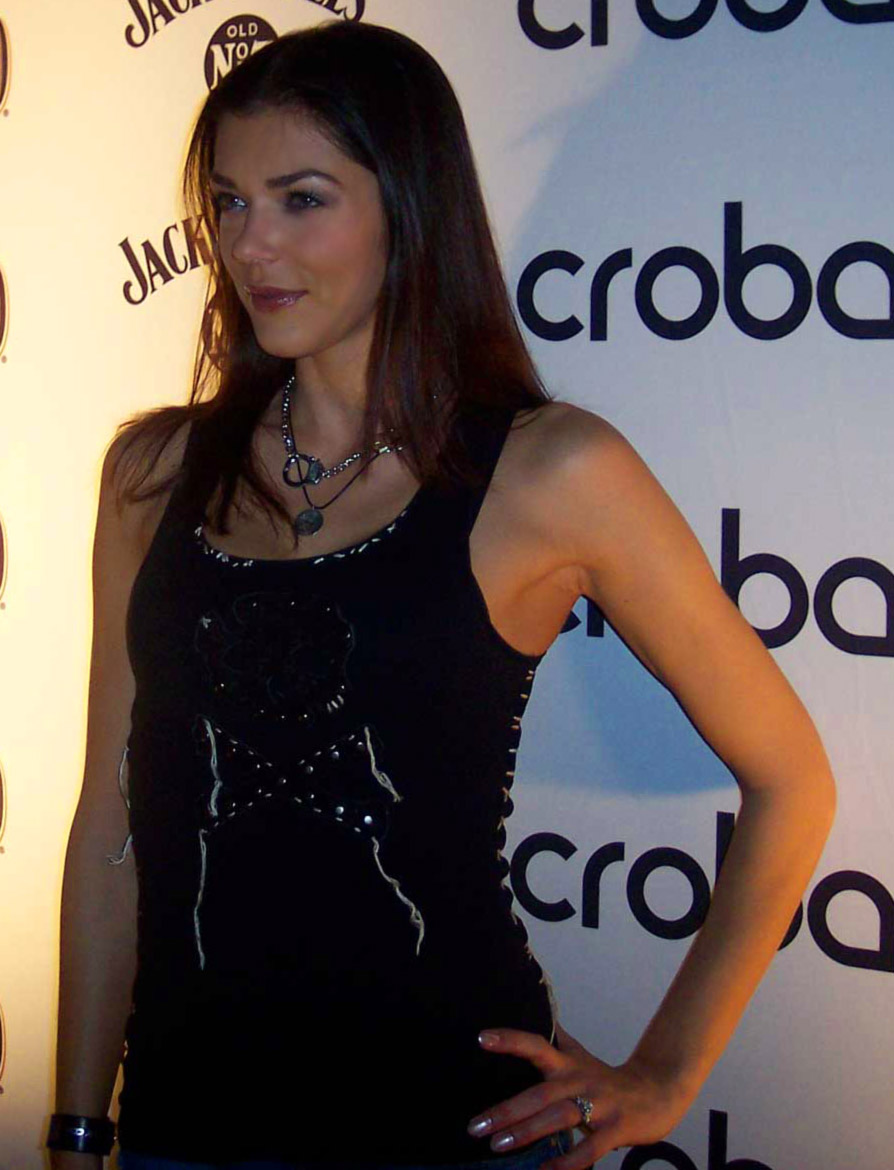
Curry at Crobar Nightclub Chicago in October 2008

She is of Italian descent through her maternal grandmother.

She married Christopher Knight in May 2006, after meeting on The Surreal Life and having their relationship documented on My Fair Brady. In 2011, the couple announced their separation and filed for divorce.

Curry announced her engagement to voice actor Matthew Rhode on August 5, 2017. Curry later left Hollywood to pursue a "normal rural" life. Curry now runs her own lifestyle blog from her remote location. She and Rhode moved to Whitefish, Montana. They eloped in Glacier National Park in Montana on September 15, 2018.

Curry was raised as a Roman Catholic but later identified as an atheist during her marriage to Christopher Knight after they had debates over religion. As of October 2020, Curry has professed her belief in God and, although remaining irreligious, stated, "I will always have a place in my heart for the Catholic Faith and their lovely Cathedrals."

In 2024, Curry announced on social media that after being a "lifetime Democrat" she had left the party and endorsed Donald Trump. In explaining her decision, she said, "I'll never forget when they started pushing extremist views about gender, identity, and kids...and then GASLIGHT people about it. I'll never forget their campaign to convince Americans that being morbidly obese is healthy. I'll never forget that they robbed Bernie twice and later RFK Jr. Of that sweet democracy they claim to be for To INSTALL Hillary & Kamala. I'll never forget all the Trump media hoaxes I debunked in 2020 by watching the full unedited videos." She added that leaving the Democratic Party was like "leaving a cult."

In February 2023, Curry faced backlash after criticizing Melanie Lynskey's casting in The Last of Us—through a since deleted tweet, implying that Lynskey's body type made her unsuitable for the role of a villainous leader. Curry suggested that such a character should have a more traditionally muscular physique. Lynskey responded emphasizing that intelligence, not physical strength, defined her character, stating, "[The character is] supposed to be smart, ma'am. I don't need to be muscly. That's what henchmen are for."

== Filmography ==
Television roles
Year	Title	Role	Notes
2003	America's Next Top Model	Herself	11 episodes
2003	Half & Half	Roberta	Episodes: "The Big Mis-Conception Episode: Part 1", "The Big Mis-Conception Episode: Part 2"
2003–2005	The Surreal Life	Herself/host	19 episodes
2004	Rock Me Baby	Herself	Episode: "Look Who's Talking"
2005	Hot Properties	Danushka	Episode: "Dating Up, Dating Down"
2005–2008	My Fair Brady	Herself	25 episodes; also co-producer
2006	Celebrity Paranormal Project	Herself	8 episodes
2007	Dirt	Herself	Episode: "The Secret Lives of Altar Girls"
2007	Dr. Phil	Herself	Episode: "Does Age Matter?"
2007	Chris & Adrianne Do Russia	Herself	TV movie documentary; also co-executive producer
2008	Gimme My Reality Show!	Herself / Judge	4 episodes
2008	Celebrity Family Feud	Herself	Episode: "American Chopper vs. Christopher Knight, Corbin Bersen vs. Margaret Cho"
2008–2009	World's Dumbest	Herself	14 episodes
2010–2012	The Tester	Herself / Judge	15 episodes
2012	Adrianne Curry's Super Fans	Herself	8 episodes; also executive producer
2015	My Cat from Hell	Herself	Episode: "My Boyfriend vs My Cat"

Film roles
Year	Title	Role	Notes
2006	Fallen Angels	Shell	
2008	Jack Rio	Lisa	
2008	Light Years Away	Alexis Best	
2015	Tales of Halloween	Herself	

New title	America's Next Top Model winner Cycle 1 (2003)	Succeeded by Yoanna House
