= The Tester =

- Genre: Reality competition
- Presented by: Meredith Molinari
- Judges: Brent Gocke (Season 1–3); Adrianne Curry (Season 2–3); Hal Sparks (Season 1); Various guest judges
- Country of origin: United States
- Original language: English
- No. of seasons: 3
- No. of episodes: 25 (list of episodes)

Production
- Running time: 18 to 33 minutes (including advertisement)
- Production company: 51 Minds Entertainment

Original release
- Network: PlayStation Network
- Release: February 18, 2010 – April 3, 2012

The Tester is a serialized reality program created by Sony Computer Entertainment and produced by 51 Minds. Notable as the first original live-action series distributed on a video game console, it features eleven or twelve contestants, selected from thousands of applicants, competing in a variety of challenges to win a job at Sony Computer Entertainment in quality assurance as a game tester with a $5,000 signing bonus and a PlayStation 3 video game console. The winner of the third season also earned an opportunity to work at Santa Monica Studio as a Production Associate on an unnamed PlayStation 3 title, a two-year lease on a 2012 Ford Focus Titanium edition and a Sony BRAVIA 3D Television. The first season launched in North America on February 18, 2010, and new episodes were released weekly until the finale aired on April 8, 2010. In its third season, the program is available as a free download exclusively on the PlayStation Network. Full seasons can also be streamed from the PlayStation website.

== Format ==
The host, Meredith Molinari, guides the contestants through physical challenges based on skills required of game testers, such as a critical eye for detail and effective communication. Each week, with the exception of the finale, at least one contestant is eliminated by a panel of three judges: release manager for Sony first-party quality assurance Brent Gocke, American model Adrianne Curry (Hal Sparks in season 1), and a special guest judge.

Eliminations are based on performance in the weekly challenges. The show is notable, however, for occasionally breaking its own rules during these eliminations. For instance, in the first episode of Season 3, instead of eliminating 2 contestants, as planned, only one was voted out.

For the finale, the three remaining contestants race each other in a final challenge with multiple chapters with the first contestant to complete all chapters crowned "the tester." The show has since produced three winners: Will "Cyrus" Powers from season 1, Matthew "Gaymer" Brown from season 2, and Wilson "AkilleezMight" Santiago from season 3.

== Casting ==
After commenting on the success of the first season, Sony Computer Entertainment America President and CEO Jack Tretton announced a second season on June 14, 2010 at Sony's keynote address at the Electronic Entertainment Expo 2010. Auditions were accepted through July 6, 2010, at which point community voting began. Among the 11 contestants chosen by Sony, the community-vote winner, "8-bit" Mickey Paradis, also joined the cast as a twelfth member. Season 2 began on November 2 with twelve brand new contestants. The first episode of the second season was made available to PlayStation Plus subscribers on October 29, 2010. The series premiered on November 2, 2010 with the finale on December 21, 2010.

The casting call for the show's third season began on August 4, 2011. Auditions and voting ended on September 17, 2011. The Top 100 were revealed on September 30, with voting ending on October 5. The Final 20 was revealed on October 18, with popular Internet personality Arin Hanson (Egoraptor) revealed as the winner of The Casting Call on October 20, 2011, after voting had ended. The third season premiered on the PlayStation Network on February 7, 2012, with the finale on April 3, 2012.

== Contestant progress ==
=== Season 1 ===
No.	Testers	1	2	3	4	5	6	7	Finale
1	Cyrus	IN	WIN	IN	IN	WIN	WIN	LOW	WINNER
2	Nauseous	IN	WIN	WIN	WIN	IN	IN	WIN	RUNNER-UP
3	Amped	IN	LOW	IN	WIN	WIN	IN	IN	RUNNER-UP
4	Star	IN	IN	WIN	LOW	LOW	LOW	OUT	
5	Doc	IN	IN	WIN	WIN	WIN	OUT		
6	Big D	IN	LOW	LOW	WIN	OUT			
7	Luge	WIN	IN	WIN	OUT				
8	Fame Girl	LOW	WIN	OUT					
9	Goof	IN	OUT						
10	Barmy	OUT							
11	Roni	OUT							

^Note 1: The premiere was a double elimination episode.
^Note 2: From episodes 2 through 5, the gamers were separated by teams each day.

=== Season 2 ===
No.	Testers	1	2	3	4	5	6	7	Finale
1	Gaymer	IN	IN	LOW	LOW	WIN	WIN	IN	WINNER
2	Scooter	IN	IN	IN	WIN	IN	IN	WIN	RUNNER-UP
3	Ches-ka	WIN	WIN	WIN	WIN	IN	IN	LOW	RUNNER-UP
4	Mo Chocolate	IN	WIN	LOW	WIN	WIN	WIN	OUT	
5	War Princess	LOW	LOW	WIN	IN	WIN	OUT		
6	Big Fazeek	LOW	WIN	IN	IN	LOW	OUT		
7	Tripplethreat	IN	IN	WIN	WIN	OUT			
8	8bit-Mickey	IN	WIN	IN	OUT				
9	FantasyGirl	IN	WIN	OUT					
10	Samurai	IN	OUT						
11	Boo	OUT							
12	Max1m	OUT							

^Note 1: The premiere was a double elimination episode.
^Note 2: From episodes 2 through 6, the gamers were separated by teams each day.
^Note 3: In episode 6, despite being among the winning team and originally receiving immunity, Big Fazeek was eliminated due to unsportsmanlike conduct.

=== Season 3 ===
No.	Testers	1	2	3	4	5	6	7	Finale
1	AkilleezMight	IN	WIN	IN	IN	WIN	IN	WIN	WINNER
2	krystipryde	IN	IN	WIN	IN	IN	LOW	IN	RUNNER-UP
3	RealityPalez	WIN	WIN	WIN	IN	LOW	IN	LOW	RUNNER-UP
4	Skyd1ddy	IN	WIN	WIN	WIN	IN	WIN	OUT	
5	Suzkaiden	IN	LOW	LOW	IN	IN	OUT		
6	kwajaMonster	LOW	WIN	WIN	IN	OUT			
7	ninjanomyx	IN	WIN	IN	OUT				
8	J-Tight	IN	IN	WIN	OUT				
9	burnNibelheim	IN	LOW	OUT					
10	egoraptor	LOW	IN	OUT					
11	Asuukaa	IN	OUT						
12	AshiChan	OUT							

^Note 1: The premiere was a double elimination episode. However, the judges allowed egoraptor to remain despite there being only ten beds available. egoraptor was told he would have to sleep on the couch.
^Note 2: The third episode resulted in double elimination. Brent stopped Meredith as she was about to excuse the contestants to also eliminate burnNibelheim.
^Note 3: The fourth episode resulted in double elimination. Despite being team play, only the winning team's captain would be safe from elimination. One player from each team was eliminated.
^Note 4: There were 9 episodes. Episode 8 is just a look back on this season's contestants.

(WINNER) The contestant won the competition and was crowned "The Tester".
(RUNNER-UP) The contestant was a runner up in the competition.
(WIN) The contestant won the episode's challenge, and was immune to elimination.
(LOW) The contestant was noted for being especially low-performing, but was not eliminated.
(OUT) The contestant lost the challenge and was eliminated from the competition.
