= List of The Tester episodes =

This is a list of episodes from the reality series The Tester.

== Episodes ==
Season	Episodes	Originally released	
Season	Episodes	First released	Last released
1	8	February 18, 2010	April 8, 2010
2	8	November 2, 2010	December 21, 2010
3	9	February 7, 2012	April 3, 2012

=== Season 1: February - April 2010 ===
No.	Title	Original release date	Prod. code
1	"The Critical Eye"	February 18, 2010	101
The 11 contestants compete in a challenge that tests their attention to detail. Pilot Episode Special Guest Judge: Petro Piaseckyj, Managing Producer for PlayStation International Software. Contestants eliminated: Roni and Barmy
2	"Communication Breakdown"	February 25, 2010	102
The 9 remaining contestants compete in a challenge which tests their ability to communicate effectively. Special Guest Judge: David Jaffe, Director and lead designer for God of War and Twisted Metal Contestant eliminated: Goof
3	"There's No "Cry" in Team"	March 4, 2010	103
The 8 contestants remaining compete in a challenge that tests their ability to be a team player. Special Guest Judge: David Jaffe Contestant eliminated: Fame Girl
4	"LARPing in the Park"	March 11, 2010	104
The 7 contestants remaining compete in a challenge that tests their imagination. Special Guest Judge: Katherine de León, Producer at PlayStation Home Contestant eliminated: Luge
5	"Buzz in or Buzz Off"	March 18, 2010	105
The remaining 6 contestants compete in a challenge that tests how much they know about all things PlayStation. Special Guest Judge: Jeff Wilkerson, Director of first-party quality assurance at PlayStation, and Brent Gocke's boss. Contestant eliminated: Big D
6	"Focus, People, Focus!"	March 25, 2010	106
The 5 remaining contestants are tested on their focus under pressure. Special Guest Judge: Kyle Shubel, Managing Producer of Killzone 2 Contestant eliminated: Doc
7	"Killer Recall"	April 1, 2010	107
The final 4 is tested on recalling important information in an ambush situation. Special Guest Judge: John Hight, Director of Product Development for God of War III Contestant eliminated: Star
8	"Season Finale"	April 8, 2010	108
The final three (Cyrus, Amped, Nauseous) compete in a four-part race based on Uncharted 2: Among Thieves to determine the winner. Season Finale Special Guest Judge: Ritchard Marklez, Senior Director of First Party Quality Assurance for PlayStation Winner of "The Tester": Cyrus (Will Powers) Runners-up: Nauseous (2nd) and Amped (3rd)

=== Season 2: November - December 2010 ===
No.	Title	Original release date	Prod. code
1	"God of Knowledge"	November 2, 2010	201
The 12 contestants compete in a challenge that tests their Playstation knowledge. Special Guest Judge: Stig Asmussen, Developer on the God of War series Contestants eliminated: Max1m and Boo
2	"Step It Up"	November 9, 2010	202
The 10 remaining contestants compete in a challenge which tests their ability to act with precision. Special Guest Judge: Ted Price, President and CEO of Insomniac Games Contestant eliminated: Samurai
3	"Can You Hear Me Now?"	November 16, 2010	203
The 9 contestants remaining compete in a challenge that tests their ability to communicate. Special Guest Judge: Deborah Mars, Senior Producer at Santa Monica Studio Contestant eliminated: FantasyGirl
4	"No Tiers in testing"	November 23, 2010	204
The 8 remaining contestants compete in a challenge that tests their teamwork. Special Guest Judge: Greg Goodrich, Producer of Medal of Honor Contestant eliminated: 8-bit Mickey
5	"Life's a Pitch"	November 30, 2010	205
The 7 remaining contestants pitch new videogame ideas to a focus group. Special Guest Judge: Michael McWhertor, Senior Editor of Kotaku Contestant eliminated: Tripplethreat
6	"Turn 'em Loose"	December 7, 2010	206
The final 6 have a racing competition that involves stuffing their face before each lap. Special Guest Judges: Cyrus (Winner) & Nauseous (1st Runner-up) from Season 1 Contestants eliminated: Big Fazeek and War Princess
7	"Trouble With Trivia"	December 14, 2010	207
The final 4 compete in a quiz show which tests them on PlayStation Knowledge Special Guest Judge: Travis Williams, Senior Producer at San Diego Studio Contestant eliminated: Mo Chocolate
8	"Season 2 Finale"	December 21, 2010	208
The final 3 contestants face off in their final challenge, in which they must complete 4 levels of gameplay based on Killzone 3. Winner: Gaymer (Matthew Brown) Runners-up: Scooter (2nd) and Ches-ka (3rd)

=== Season 3: February - April 2012 ===
No.	Title	Original release date	Prod. code
1	"Bug Out!"	February 7, 2012	301
The 12 contestants compete in a challenge which tests their ability to remain calm under pressure. Special Guest Judge: John Hight, Director of Product development for God of War III Contestant eliminated: AshiChan
2	"Twisted Teamwork"	February 14, 2012	302
The 11 remaining contestants compete in a challenge that tests their teamwork. Special Guest Judge: David Jaffe, Director and Lead Designer for God of War and Twisted Metal Contestant eliminated: Asuukaa
3	"Make Like Drake"	February 21, 2012	303
The 10 remaining contestants compete in a challenge that tests their ability to overcome obstacles. The winning team got to meet special guest Nolan North, the voice of Nathan Drake. Special Guest Judge: John Garvin, Co-Studio Director and Creative Director of Bend Studio, Writer and Director of Uncharted: Golden Abyss Contestants eliminated: Egoraptor and burnNibelheim
4	"Creative Crossover"	February 28, 2012	304
The 8 remaining contestants put their creativity to the test when they created their own characters based on the Street Fighter X Tekken video game, including acting out their characters in a live demonstration of the video game. Special Guest Judge: Seth Killian, Special Combat Advisor, Capcom Contestants eliminated: ninjanomyx and J-Tight
5	"Blindfold Battle!"	March 6, 2012	305
The 6 remaining contestants divide into teams, only to be blindfolded while tethered to an altar. The objective? Communicate with your partner to find and match as many objects related to the God of War franchise as possible within the given time limit. The winners (and one lucky loser) got to go to Santa Monica Studio to see an undisclosed video game and interview with the production team. Special Guest Judge: Todd Papy, Creative Director, Santa Monica Studio Contestant eliminated: kwajamonster
6	"Tower Power!"	March 13, 2012	306
Now down to 5 players, it's every (wo)man for themself as they fill out a questionnaire with questions about the remaining players. Then they meet with the judges outside, learning they must build a tower as high as possible after matching the most common answer for each question. Special Guest Judge: Dylan Jobe, President, LightBox Interactive Contestant eliminated: Suzkaiden
7	"PlayStation Trivia Trial!"	March 20, 2012	307
Four players remain, vying for the top three. After a Home Run Derby contest, the four players meet out on a baseball field to settle once and for all who knows the most PlayStation trivia. Every correct response allowed them a chance to dunk one of their opponents in the dunk tank, provided they could hit the target. Special Guest Judge: Greg Miller, Executive Editor, IGN PlayStation® Contestant eliminated: Skyd1ddy
8	"Moving Forward By Looking Back"	March 27, 2012	308
The eliminated contestants look back at some of their favourite moments, plus extra scenes never before seen from this season.
9	"Season Finale"	April 3, 2012	309
The final three players face off in the final challenge based on the game Starhawk. Winner: AkilleezMight (Wilson Santiago) Runners-up: krystipryde (2nd), RealityPalez (3rd)
