= Deal or No Deal (American game show) =

American game show, launched 2005

- Genre: Game show
- Created by: Dick de Rijk; John de Mol
- Directed by: Rich DiPirro; Alan Carter; Marco Mancini; Ken Fuchs
- Presented by: Howie Mandel
- Starring: Peter Abbay; Carrie Lauren
- Announcer: Joe Cipriano
- Theme music composer: GROOVEWORX
- Country of origin: United States
- Original language: English
- No. of seasons: 8 (5 on NBC, 2 in syndication, 1 on CNBC)
- No. of episodes: NBC: 274; Syndication: 300; CNBC: 31

Production
- Executive producers: Scott St. John (2005–2019); Howie Mandel (2018–2019)
- Production locations: CBS Television City (2005); Sunset Gower Studios (2006); The Culver Studios (2006–2009); Sonalyst Studios (2009–2010); Universal Studios Florida (2018–2019)
- Camera setup: Multi-camera
- Running time: 44 minutes (NBC, CNBC); 22–26 minutes (Syndicated)
- Production companies: Endemol USA (2005–2010); Lock and Key Productions (2006); Entertain the Brutes Productions (2008–2010); NBCUniversal Television Distribution (2008–2010); Truly Original (2018–2019); Endemol Shine North America (2018–2019)

Original release
- Network: NBC
- Release: December 19, 2005 – May 18, 2009
- Network: Syndication
- Release: September 8, 2008 – May 28, 2010
- Network: CNBC
- Release: December 3, 2018 – August 7, 2019

Deal or No Deal is an American version of the international game show of Dutch origin of the same name. The show is hosted by Howie Mandel, and premiered on December 19, 2005, on NBC. The hour-long show typically aired at least twice a week during its run, and included special extended or theme episodes. The main series ran for four seasons (2005 to 2010), and was revived in 2018 for a fifth season. A daily syndicated half-hour version of the show debuted on September 8, 2008, and continued for two seasons.

The game is primarily unchanged from the international format: a contestant chooses one briefcase from a selection of 26. Each briefcase contains a cash value from $0.01 to $1,000,000. Over the course of the game, the contestant eliminates cases from the game, periodically being presented with a "deal" from The Banker to take a cash amount to exit the game based on amounts left on the game board. Should the contestant refuse every deal, they then win the amount in their originally selected case.

The show was a success for NBC, typically averaging from 10 to 16 million viewers each episode in the first season, although the subsequent seasons only averaged about 5–9 million viewers each episode. It has led to the creation of tie-in board, card, arcade, and video games, as well as a syndicated series played for smaller dollar amounts. The show went on hiatus in early 2009, and its Friday night time slot was replaced with Mandel's other series Howie Do It. The network later announced that Deal or No Deal would return on May 4, 2009, to air its remaining episodes. These remaining four were taped in September 2008, and aired on three consecutive Mondays, May 4, 2009, May 11, 2009, and the final two on May 18, 2009.

On December 3, 2018, the show returned to NBC as a holiday special with original host Howie Mandel. New episodes of the program began airing on CNBC on December 5, 2018. The show aired its final episode on August 7, 2019.

== Gameplay ==
The contestant chooses one of 26 numbered briefcases at the start of the game. These cases, carried by 26 identically dressed female models, each hold a different cash amount from $0.01 to $1,000,000. The cash amounts are randomly placed in the cases by a third party before the game and no one, including the host, models or the producers know which amount is in which case. On the stage is a video wall that displays the amounts still in play at any given moment. The contestant's chosen case is brought onto the stage and placed on a podium before them and the host.

In the first round, the contestant chooses six cases to eliminate from play, one at a time. Each case is opened as it is chosen, and the amount inside is removed from the board. After the sixth pick, a cordless telephone on the podium rings and the host answers it to speak with "The Banker", visible only as a silhouette, who sits in a skybox overlooking the studio. The Banker's face is never seen, and their voice is never heard. After the call ends, the host relays the Banker's offer to buy the contestant's case. The contestant can accept the offer and end the game by saying "deal" and pressing a red button on the podium, or reject it by saying "no deal" and closing a hinged cover over the button.

Each time an offer is rejected, the contestant must play another round, eliminating progressively fewer cases: five in the second round, four in the third, three in the fourth, two in the fifth. Beyond the fifth round, the contestant eliminates one case at a time, receiving a new offer from the Banker after each. The ninth and final offer comes when there are only two cases left in play: the one originally chosen by the contestant and one other. If the contestant rejects this final offer, they may either keep the chosen case or trade it for the other. The contestant receives the amount in the case taken.

The Banker's offer is typically a percentage of the average of the values still in play at the end of each round. This percentage is small in the early rounds, but increases as the game continues and can even exceed 100% in very late rounds. At times, an offer includes a prize tailored to the contestant's interests, either in addition to cash or instead of it. Also, prizes are occasionally substituted for some of the cash amounts on the board. Starting with the Banker's offer in the second round, the contestant can bring a "cheering section" (e.g., friends, family members or colleagues) to the edge of the stage for advice on case selection and whether to accept offers. However, only the contestant's decisions are counted as part of the game.

If a contestant accepts one of the Banker's first eight offers, and if time permits, the host encourages the contestant to play through additional rounds to see what would have happened if they had not accepted the offer. If time runs short, the last value that was higher than the contestant's taken offer is eliminated in the proveout, if the contestant wasn't going to win much, or if there are only two cases remaining, the host opens the contestant's case to see whether their deal is a good or bad one, and then all of the remaining cases are opened at once.

=== 2018 changes ===
For the 2018 revival on CNBC, the Banker was female instead of male, and instead of a wireless phone, Mandel used an iPhone to communicate with the Banker. Once per game, the contestant could counter the Banker's offer after any round by naming a higher price to stop playing. If the Banker accepted the counter-offer, the contestant received the amount they had stated and the game ended immediately. If the banker rejected the counter-offer, the contestant had to play onto the next round.

Similar to the syndicated series, there was no option to swap cases after the final round, when only the contestant's case and one other were still in play. If the contestant rejected the Banker's final offer (and the contestant had their own counter-offer rejected, if applicable), they received the amount in the originally chosen case, plus any applicable bonuses.

=== Payout structure ===
On Deal or No Deal, the values hidden in the 26 briefcases typically range from $0.01 to $1,000,000:

$0.01
$1
$5
$10
$25
$50
$75
$100
$200
$300
$400
$500
$750

$1,000
$5,000
$10,000
$25,000
$50,000
$75,000
$100,000
$200,000
$300,000
$400,000
$500,000
$750,000
$1,000,000

Some special episodes feature a board with doubled values, and others feature multiple increases of possible prizes.

== Models ==
Each season of Deal or No Deal features 26 models who each bear one of the cases in play. There have been 68 different models over its five seasons, ranging from tenures of one season (39 models) to the full five seasons (two models).

| Case | Season 1 | Season 2 | Season 3 | Season 4 | Season 5 |
|---|---|---|---|---|---|
| 1 | Claudia Jordan | | | | Soraya Yd |
| 2 | Stacey Gardner | | | | Taylor Clark |
| 3 | Lisa Gleave | | | | Katie Luddy |
| 4 | Lindsay Schoneweis | | Keltie Martin | | Brenda Lowe |
| 5 | Ursula Mayes | | | | Lani Baker |
| 6 | Megan Abrigo | | | | |
| 7 | Sara Bronson | | | | Jordana DePaula |
| 8 | Pilar Lastra | Lauren Shiohama | | Mariela Arteaga | Neka Stephens |
| 9 | Patricia Kara | | | | |
| 10 | Anya Monzikova | | | | Vaeda Mann |
| 11 | Katie Cleary | | | | Brittany McGowan |
| 12 | Jill Manas | | | Lauren Shiohama | Sarati Toups |
| 13 | Leyla Milani | | | | Mahogany Lox |
| 14 | April Scott | Pilar Lastra | | | Olga Safari |
| 15 | Lanisha Cole | Brooke Long | | | Madi Teeuws |
| 16 | Kimberly Estrada | Kasie Head | Krissy Carlson | Lisa Lakatos | Jessica Lee |
| 17 | Jenelle Bronwyn Moreno | | | | Ashley Jones |
| 18 | Alike Boggan | Marisa Petroro | | | Elissa Ingrid |
| 19 | Mylinda Tov | | | Amanza Smith | Natasha Ward |
| 20 | Marisa Petroro | Alike Boggan | | | Amanza Smith |
| 21 | Tameka Jacobs | | | | Malika Miller |
| 22 | Donna Feldman | Laura Shields | Lianna Grethel | Crystal Monte | Anchal Joseph |
| 23 | Aubrie Lemon | | | | Anne-Julia Hagen |
| 24 | Nancy Stelle | Meghan Markle | Kelly Brannigan | | Kizzi Barazetti |
| 25 | Sonia Vera | Hayley Marie Norman | | | Summer Bellessa |
| 26 | Lindsay Clubine | | | | Michelle De Leon |

== Broadcast history ==
Seasonal rankings (based on the average total viewers per episode) of Deal or No Deal on NBC.

Note: Each U.S. network television season starts in late September and ends in late May, which coincides with the completion of May sweeps. All times mentioned are in the Eastern and Pacific time zones.

=== Original series ===
==== Season 1 (2005–06) ====
| TV Season | Timeslot | Rank | Rating |
| 2005–2006 | Monday 8:00 p.m. | #15 | 9.6 (Note: Tied with Dancing with the Stars — Results) |
| 2005–2006 | Wednesday 8:00 p.m. | #21 | 9.0 (Note: Tied with 60 Minutes) |
| 2005–2006 | Friday 8:00 p.m. | Not in the Top 30 | |

Early ratings for the show were extremely encouraging. According to Zap2it, "all five shows [during the week beginning December 19, 2005, and ending December 25, 2005] finished in the top 15 among total viewers, peaking with 14.1 million people watching the Wednesday, December 21, 2005 installment. For the week, Deal or No Deal averaged about 12.7 million viewers and a solid 4.3 rating in the adults 18–49."

The show appeared again on NBC each night February 27, 2006 through March 3, 2006 at 8:00 p.m. ET/PT with the top prize (and some of the higher-valued cases other than the top prize) escalating until the prize reached $3 million (and the lowest-valued case going up to $.03). As of March 6, 2006, the show settled into regular time slots at 8:00 p.m. Mondays and Fridays, with the top prize returning to its original $1 million. Wednesday episodes were added at 8:00 PM due to the show's consistent ratings success. In something of a ratings coup, the April 3, 2006 episode of the show, a two-hour special, outperformed the NCAA basketball tournament final in a head-to-head competition. During both of the two-hour shows, the second hour scored even higher ratings than the first.

Once it became a regular series, Deal or No Deal consistently placed within the 20 most popular programs on television, at times landing the top 10. The June 5, 2006 two-hour season finale, which featured Celine Dion via satellite, marked a series-high rating for the program, bringing in over 18 million viewers and a strong 5.5 share in the 18–49 demographic. The episode was easily the highest-rated show on any network for the week of June 5, 2006 through June 11, 2006, outdistancing the number-two show, a repeat episode of CSI, by almost six million viewers. The finale experienced similar success in Canada, with 1.5 million viewers tuning in. (However, CSI and nearly all other fall TV series had completed their seasons two weeks earlier and were either in reruns or pre-empted by this point.)

==== Season 2 (2006–07) ====
| TV Season | Timeslot | Rank | Rating |
| 2006–2007 | Monday 8:00 p.m. | #13 | 9.2 |
| 2006–2007 | Friday 8:00 p.m. | Not in the Top 30 | |
| 2006–2007 | Sun/Wed/Thu 8:00 p.m. | Not in the Top 30 | |

The show returned with new episodes in September 2006, airing on Mondays and Fridays at 8:00 p.m. and Thursdays at 9:00 p.m. the latter time slot being perhaps the most competitive in U.S. television, as Deal or No Deal faced a pair highly rated programs, CSI on CBS, and Grey's Anatomy on ABC. Both shows were in the top 10.

Deal's Thursday time slot had initially been intended for Studio 60 on the Sunset Strip when NBC announced its fall schedule. However, the program moved on May 25 from its announced Friday time slot to Thursdays. The drama Crossing Jordan, which had been planned for a mid-season run, was to be brought into the Friday lineup in what would have been Deal's second weekly time slot. However, after Deal or No Deal completed airing special episodes in that time slot to success, NBC moved Crossing Jordan back to midseason and used Deal on Fridays as well to help launch another game show, 1 vs. 100.

The show premiered with a two-hour edition on September 18, 2006, and one-hour episodes that each aired on September 19, 2006, September 21, 2006, and September 22, 2006. The show used a $21 million prize pot over the first week to kick off season two of the game, coupled with the at-home Lucky Case Game for $1 million. During the season premiere week in 2006, the main game had maximum amounts start at $1 million, and increased $1 million for each game, up to $6 million. The top prize case was only chosen once by contestant Matty Sollena on the season premiere. He took the deal for $675,000, but his case contained the top prize of $3,000,000.

According to final Nielsen ratings for the week of September 18, 2006 to September 24, 2006, the second-season premiere episode of Deal or No Deal on Monday, September 18, 2006 with Matty Sollena was the 11th most-watched network prime time show in total audience and NBC's most-watched program in total audience. The Friday episode of the show also did well in the ratings and won its time slot against the other networks. The Tuesday and Thursday episodes suffered from tough competition: Dancing with the Stars, Grey's Anatomy, and CSI.

The success of Deal or No Deal was a factor in NBC's decision to program another Endemol game, 1 vs. 100, which premiered on October 13, 2006 and assumed Deal's Friday night time slot on October 27, 2006. Meanwhile, NBC announced the Thursday episodes would end with the November 8, 2006, to be replaced by sitcoms Scrubs and 30 Rock. Through all these changes, the Monday night edition of Deal continued to win its time slot by a large margin. On Monday, October 30, 2006, for instance, Deal won its time slot with a 10.3 household rating and 16 percent share, easily outdistancing second-place Prison Break at 5.6/8. During the November sweeps period, the ratings for Deal or No Deal on Thursday grew slightly despite heavy competition in the time slot. NBC moved the second weekly episode of Deal or No Deal to Wednesday at 9:00 p.m. as of January 2007, and also added a few episodes at 7:00 p.m. Sundays in hopes of giving a boost to its new post-football lineup. NBC announced on February 16, 2007 that the second airing would move from Wednesdays to Sundays at 9:00 p.m. (Eastern/Pacific) starting March 4, 2007.

In March, the Monday Deal fell to second place in the time slot, behind the debuting fourth edition of ABC's Dancing with the Stars, the first edition of that show to include a Monday episode.

==== Season 3 (2007–08) ====
Following a season-premiere episode on Monday, Deal vacated its stable Monday night home in a last-second decision by NBC to give the time slot to a drama series, Chuck, for which it had high hopes. (This move contradicted earlier statements from the network that it had planned to exclusively use unscripted programming in the 8:00 p.m. hour.) Deal moved to a Wednesday/Friday schedule, pushing 1 vs. 100 to mid-season. Both airings tended to win their time slot in total viewers, with the Friday edition also winning in Adults 18–49 and the Wednesday edition placing second in that demographic behind ABC's Pushing Daisies. In another surprising move, NBC replaced the Wednesday airings for five weeks with a short-run reality series, Phenomenon, starting in late October. The initial ratings for Phenomenon were lower than what Deal was delivering.

Due to the 2007 Writers Guild of America strike, Deal's Friday edition moved back to Monday in January 2008, at least temporarily replacing Chuck. The Friday time slot was filled by the returning 1 vs 100 for seven episodes. 1 vs. 100 has taken another hiatus as of February 22, 2008, and has been replaced in the same time slot by the game show Amnesia, which premiered after 1 vs. 100 on February 22, 2008.

The Monday edition of the show ranked No. 28 with a 7.1 rating, tying it with Cold Case.

==== Season 4 (2008–09) ====
The fourth season began on August 25, 2008, with host Mandel stating prior to the season premiere that there would be at least one millionaire in the season. The beginning of the fourth season also marked the return of an audience competition – the new "Beat the Banker" game brought back the interactivity from past seasons, with home viewers being able to win $10,000 per show.

The following week, Jessica Robinson became the first winner with the $1,000,000 top prize. Robinson appeared during the Million-Dollar Mission, and in her game had five cases containing the $1,000,000 prize. Robinson turned down a final bank offer of $561,000, keeping her case—number 4—and won $1,000,000.

After Robinson won, the "Million-Dollar Mission" restarted with two $1,000,000 cases on the board, and played until the second $1,000,000 prize was awarded to Tomorrow Rodriguez on October 29, 2008, with nine $1,000,000 cases on the board. Her highest offer was $677,000, with three of the four cases still in play at the time containing $1,000,000 and the other containing $300. By eliminating the $300 case, which was in case number 15, she automatically won the top prize (in case number 7) with fewer than nine offers having been made.

The week before Rodriguez's victory, the October 22, 2008 episode featured the most infamous contestant when Richie Bell of Karns City, Pennsylvania kept his briefcase (case number 15) all the way to the end and turning down multiple banker offers of over $400,000 and it came down to either the $1,000,000 prize or $1 after turning down the final offer of $416,000. After turning down an offer to switch cases with the remaining case (case number 11), it was revealed that Bell had the $1 case, and only received a consolation prize of $10,001. Bell's blunder turned into an internet meme, though Mandel would later state that Bell was one of his favorite contestants. A 2018 update showed Bell now living with his family in Henderson, Nevada and having lost considerable weight after having successful gastric sleeve surgery.

Deal or No Deal aired its 200th-episode celebration on November 3, 2008, with a series of four speed-round games with four different contestants; however, NBC aired this episode out of order, and in reality only 186 episodes had aired at this point. In the episode, the contestant chose all the cases to open for a round at once and they were opened right away. They only had 20 seconds to accept a bank offer or not. If time ran out, it was an automatic "No Deal". After accepting a bank offer, the contestant's case was immediately opened without playing on to find out what would have happened had they declined the offer.

On May 19, 2009, it was announced that the fourth season would be the last prime time season of the show. The syndicated show continued for one additional season before it ended its run in 2010.

=== Revival series ===
==== Season 5 (2018–19) ====
On March 13, 2018, it was announced that CNBC would be reviving Deal or No Deal for another season. Mandel returned as host and served as co-executive producer along with Scott St. John, who served in the role for the original series. Thirty one-hour episodes began taping at Universal Orlando in July 2018 and concluded taping on August 11, 2018.

On July 24, 2018, it was announced that the show would premiere on CNBC on December 5, 2018.

The fifth season began on December 5, 2018, with host Mandel along with several new models. Returning models from the original series include Patricia Kara, Megan Abrigo, and Amanza Smith. Additionally, one of the new models was Mahogany Lox, granddaughter of Motown Records owner Berry Gordy.

==== Potential second revival ====
In December 2025, it was reported that Endemol Shine North America was shopping a new revival of the series, following the cancellation of Deal or No Deal Island.

=== Deal or No Deal Island ===
On May 12, 2023, NBC announced that it had ordered a spin-off reality competition series, Deal or No Deal Island, with Mandel as executive producer. The series was billed as a mix of Deal or No Deal with Survivor, in which contestants will compete to collect briefcases on the banker's "private island", with the winning player having a chance to play for the largest prize in the show's history. On September 27, 2023, it was announced that Joe Manganiello would serve as host. On November 20, 2023, it was announced that the series would premiere on February 26, 2024. The cast of 13 contestants was announced on January 8, 2024, and includes former Deal or No Deal model Claudia Jordan and former Survivor contestant "Boston" Rob Mariano.

A second season was ordered in May 2024, with it premiering on January 7, 2025. Its contestants were announced on October 10, 2024, notable ones revealed here were Australian Survivor contestant David Genat, four-time Survivor contestant Parvati Shallow, and two-time Big Brother contestant Dr. Will Kirby. The season concluded on March 25, 2025, and the series was cancelled in December 2025 after two seasons.

=== Cable ===
NBC's sister business network CNBC aired episodes of the premiere week of Deal or No Deal starting on December 26, 2005, scoring above-average ratings for the network. The show has been blacked out in Canada on that station due to programming rights issues in that country, and Canadian viewers were shown CNBC World programming instead. The show began to rerun again on CNBC during the week of February 6, 2006 until June 9, 2006. CNBC also programmed the second week long series of the show, but the sequence started two shows behind the airings on NBC.

For season two, following a marathon of its premiere week, CNBC announced that Deal or No Deal re-airings would be back on Saturday nights starting October 14, 2006 at 8:00 p.m., 11:00 p.m., and 3:00 a.m. (all Eastern). In addition, reruns aired on CNBC every Tuesday and Wednesday at 8:00 p.m., 11:00 p.m., and 1:00 a.m. The reruns are not necessarily repeats of the most recent episodes—many of these episodes are selected at random, and may have been previously seen several months after its initial broadcast. Additionally, reruns have sporadically aired on Game Show Network (GSN) when they started airing reruns of the show in production order.

In Canada, DTour also aired the series, starting with the February 2006 premiere week of episodes. The five-episode run of the Canadian show, Deal or No Deal Canada was aired on Global TV in August 2007. The franchise was also hosted by Mandel.

=== Deal or No Deal channel ===
Deal or No Deal Universe

YouTube information
- Channel: @DealOrNoDealUniverse
- Years active: 2020–present
- Genre: Game show
- Subscribers: 150 thousand
- Views: 97.7 million
- Last updated: July 23, 2026

The Deal or No Deal channel, launched in 2020, is a free or value-added channel dedicated to airing reruns of the NBC game show. In the United States, the service is available for free on Plex, Pluto TV, and Xumo. In Canada and the United States, the service is available on LG Channels and Samsung TV Plus, which require a compatible LG or Samsung device. Episodes may air sequentially or in shuffle play, and the episode schedule may be different between each streaming service.

The Deal or No Deal Universe channel on YouTube also launched in 2020. It features live and on demand reruns of the US versions from NBC, CNBC, and syndication, along with reruns of Deal or No Deal Australia from the Network Ten version and Deal or No Deal UK from the Channel 4 and ITV versions. Episodes from the US show are available worldwide, except in Russia, while episodes from the Australian show are blacked out in Australia and New Zealand.

== Syndicated version ==
A daily half-hour syndicated version, distributed by NBCUniversal Television Distribution, debuted on September 8, 2008, with Mandel as host, and featuring a format similar to the UK version. The syndicated version offered a top prize of $500,000, hidden in one of the 22 cases available for choosing by contestants rather than the 26 in play in the show's standard format. The show only featured two of the original 26 case models, Tameka Jacobs and Patricia Kara.

This version lasted two seasons, ending in May 2010 due to declining ratings.

=== Gameplay ===
$.01
$1
$5
$10
$25
$50
$100
$200
$300
$400
$500

$1,000
$2,500
$5,000
$7,500
$10,000
$25,000
$50,000
$75,000
$100,000
$250,000
$500,000

Case Values

The same 22 contestants appeared for the entire week. One contestant played at a time, and five complete games were played per week. Prior to each game, 22 individual dollar amounts ranging from $0.01 to $500,000 were distributed by a third-party among 22 briefcases, and the values were unknown to the host, the Banker or any other entity. The cases were then randomly presented to the 22 contestants by the models.

The game began with the models spinning the "Deal Wheel", a wheel with 22 numbers corresponding to the numbers on the cases. A golden ball was placed into the wheel and as it spun, the ball bounced around inside the wheel to various numbers. When the wheel stopped, whichever number the ball landed is the contestant who competed in the game. Their case was then placed on a podium. The contestant had the opportunity to either keep the case they began the game with or swap with one of the remaining 21 cases.

Through a series of rounds, the contestant was asked to select a number of the other cases still in play. Each case was opened and the value revealed within it taken out of play. A large electronic board was used to track which dollar amounts still remained in the game. After completing the selection of cases for that round, the Banker called the host using a phone on the podium, who then verbally revealed to the contestant of the Banker's "offer", a cash value based upon the remaining values in play, for the contestant to accept and end the game immediately. The game moved in a similar fashion to the broadcast version, which progressively removed cases from the game until the contestant accepted an offer or retained their original case and won the value inside.

Each round progressively removed fewer cases from the game: the first and second round with five cases to be removed; the third round with four; the fourth and fifth rounds with two; and subsequently down to removing one case at a time. If the game progressed to just two cases remaining—the contestant's original and the final unopened case—the contestant was given the choice to take the final offer or win whatever is in the case they kept. There is no opportunity to swap cases in this version. If the contestant took a deal prior to the final round, the host usually encouraged the contestant to play through to the end to see what would have happened.

=== Deal's $10K Giveaway ===
The syndicated version also has a "Lucky Case Game" called Deal's $10K Giveaway, playing for $10,000 cash. Unlike the prime-time version, the contest lasts all week (with one winner per week), and viewers participate by calling a toll-free number. There are also 5 regular cases rather than 6 gold cases. The contest is designed as an advertisement for the Deal or No Deal Club, a club where shoppers could get special discounts for a monthly fee at their website.

In season two, this was changed to Deal Mania!!!, giving away a $1,000 prize rather than $10,000 cash. The contest works almost exactly like Deal's $10K Giveaway, except that viewers can enter 5 times a day by calling the toll-free number or an unlimited number of times on the website. Deal Mania!!! is also played every weekday and holds weekend sweepstakes as well.

=== History ===
Originally, Mandel planned not to host the syndicated version, as his asking price to host it, in addition to the prime time NBC version, was considered to be outside of the production budget. Arsenio Hall was first considered to be the host, and even taped a pilot for the syndicated version, but was later passed over. According to rumors, Mark Curry and Frank Nicotero were also among the candidates. NBC also had concerns that the syndicated show would harm the prime time show, as Who Wants to Be a Millionaire had suffered from overexposure. However, the syndicated version debuted September 8, 2008, with Mandel as host.

Initially, NBC planned to package this program with the Program Partners-produced Merv Griffin's Crosswords for its first season, as its owned and operated stations were already airing Crosswords and were picking up Deal or No Deal as well. However, this was later scrapped after Crosswords abruptly stopped production after its first season and most, if not all, of the NBC O&Os aired Deal or No Deal in a double-run format as a result.

As Deal or No Deal became an exclusively syndicated show for the 2009–10 season, production moved from the Culver Studios in Culver City, California to the Sonalyst Studios in Waterford, Connecticut, as part of a corporate decision in which four NUTD shows moved to Connecticut. The show started taping in high-definition.

== Production notes ==
The original pilot was produced for ABC in early 2004 with Irish TV personality Patrick Kielty as host and a $2.5 million top prize. It was announced that the show would premiere in March 2004, but ABC decided against airing the series.

The first season was taped at Sunset Gower Studios; however, early episodes were taped at CBS Television City, both in Los Angeles. Seasons two through four were taped at Culver Studios in Culver City, California. The second syndicated season was taped at the Sonalyst Studios in Waterford, Connecticut. The 2018 revival was based at Universal Orlando in Florida.

As was stated, episodes had a tendency to be themed around the contestant depending upon information the production team obtained on them. Mandel stated that this was done "to make the contestant feel comfortable" (and was the case since early in Season Two); However, critics cited an over-reliance by the series on contestant-based "theme" shows.

=== Special versions derived from the American version ===
- NBC and Endemol had produced a Spanish-language version which debuted on October 8, 2006, on their Telemundo Spanish-language channel. Titled Vas o No Vas (Go or No Go) but titled on the English-language closed captioning Take It or Leave It, this version was hosted by Héctor Sandarti, who also hosted the Mexican version of the same name for Televisa. The top prize was $250,000. The November 5, 2006, episode had the contestant winning $180,500 and a Ford F-150 for a total of over $200,000, an all-time record for an American-based Spanish-language game show. However, this version was not as successful as the English version and was not renewed for a second season.
- After the conclusion of Super Bowl XLI on February 4, 2007, Deal or No Deal Canada, a special Canadian version of Deal or No Deal, made its debut on Global. This version of the show, taped January 23, 2007, through January 25, 2007, in Toronto, features Mandel, a Toronto native, as host. The series ran for five hour-long episodes. Applications for auditioning were very similar to the NBC version, except that no videos are required. The $400,000 was removed and had a Toonie ($2) put on the left side. Since Mandel started filming again in Canada for Howie Do It, rumors have been spreading that Deal or No Deal Canada may be returning as a real Canadian series and even a syndicated Canadian version, though it never resurfaced.
- Also in Canada, TVA has produced a French-Canadian version of Deal or No Deal called Le Banquier, named after the mysterious figure that contestants must make deals with to obtain as much money as possible. The show, which is practically the same as the American version, has 26 cases with a $500,000 top prize, although there was one game where it was increased to $750,000. The only difference is that the models on the top row (cases 21–26) are men.
- All American and Canadian editions are produced by Endemol USA, with the American and Canadian English versions both using Scott St. John as Executive Producer and R. Brian DiPirro as Director.

== Merchandise ==
=== Video games ===
| Format | Manufacturer / Developer |
|---|---|
| Arcade video game | Innovative Concepts in Entertainment, Inc. (ICE) |
| Board game | Pressman Toy Corporation |
| Card game | Cardinal Industries |
| DVD game | Imagination Games |
| Game Boy Advance | DSI Games |
| Handheld Electronic Game | i-Toys |
| Nintendo DS | DSI Games |
| Wii | IndiePub |
| Windows | 2K Games |
| Plug & Play TV Game | Jakks Pacific |
| Tabletop Electronic Game | i-Toys |
| Talking Pass'n Play Game | i-Toys |
| Video Slot Machine | Atronic |
| Online Game | Facebook |

=== Scratch-off lottery tickets ===
Several states in the U.S. have had some kind of Deal or No Deal scratch-off ticket, with the top prize determined by each lottery to the grand prize winner. Non-winning tickets may be used to enter a sweepstakes for a variety of prizes, including a chance to be on the game show.

=== On-board shows ===
In 2022, Princess Cruises presented a special version of Deal or No Deal on select cruises, with the show first held aboard Discovery Princess on March 27, 2022. Unlike the TV show format, the on-board shows had passengers playing the game, with the "case card" appearing on screen instead of the cases held by the models. The winner of each game got a chance to win a free cruise or up to $1,000 in cash when they play along. This format has also appeared on cruises operated by Carnival Cruises, Norwegian Cruise Lines, and Celebrity Cruises.

== See also ==
- Deal or No Deal
- Deal or No Deal Island
- List of longest-running American television series
