= Wrestlemaniac =

2006 American horror film

- DVD cover
- Directed by: Jesse Baget
- Written by: Jesse Baget
- Produced by: Chris Moore; Jake Schmidt
- Starring: Rey Misterio Sr. Irwin Keyes; Leyla Milani
- Cinematography: Tabbert Filler
- Edited by: Jesse Baget
- Music by: Jim Lang
- Production companies: The Film Fund; Blue Cactus Pictures
- Distributed by: Anchor Bay Entertainment
- Release date: October 20, 2006 (Hollywood Film Festival)
- Running time: 75 minutes
- Country: United States
- Language: English

Wrestlemaniac (also known as El Mascarado Massacre) is a 2006 American slasher film written and directed by Jesse Baget and starring Rey Misterio Sr.

== Plot ==
On their way to Cabo San Lucas, the cast and crew of a low-budget film get lost and come upon La Sangre De Dios, a ghost town with a spine-tingling legend about an insane Mexican wrestler. The leader of the pack and first time director, Alphonse, likes the town's gritty appearance and decides it would be the perfect setting for his film. The crew positions the camera and snaps on the lights. When Alphonse yells "Action!", it arouses the famous and now insane Luchador, "El Mascarado", who begins a game of his own. One by one, the cast and crew are snatched, beaten and dragged to a bloody death. The few left alive must figure out how to beat the wrestler at his own deadly game, or die trying.

== Cast ==
- Rey Misterio Sr. (credited as Rey Misterio) as "El Mascarado".
- Adam Huss as Alfonse.
- Jeremy Radin as Steve.
- Leyla Milani as Dallas.
- Margaret Scarborough as Debbie.
- Catherine Wreford as Daisy.
- Zack Bennett as Jim "Jimbo".
- Irwin Keyes as The Stranger.
- Fred Tatasciore as El Mascarado's Voice.
- Tabbert Fiiller as Spanish Doctor's Voice.
- Santo as Himself (Uncredited).
- Captain America as Himself (Uncredited)
- Blue Demon as Himself. (Uncredited)

== Release ==
=== Home media ===
Wrestlemaniac was released on DVD by Revolver Entertainment on April 30, 2007. It was later released by Lionsgate on March 11, 2008.

== Reception ==
Daryl Loomis of DVD Verdict gave the film a negative review, in his summary of the film he stated, "Had Wrestlemaniac taken place in its intended location and had the cast and crew more time to put the film together, it likely would have been far better. As it stands, there's very little to like here. I appreciate the director's love of low-budget filmmaking, and his brutal honesty in the commentary is welcome, but there are too many holes to recommend to anybody who isn't suckered in by the wrestling and horror combination". Steve Barton of Dread Central rated the film a score of 3.5 out of 5, calling it "cheesy fun". Andrew Smith from Popcorn Pictures gave the film a score of 5/10, writing, "In this current fad of torture, sadism and being as authentic and serious as possible, it’s nice to see a film come along with no designs on being anything than just a fun slasher. Wrestlemaniac is an enjoyable timewaster with a decent villain and some decent moments."

== Sequel ==
The film's director Jesse Baget stated in an interview with Bloody Good Horror that he plans of filming a sequel for the film stating "I definitely have some ideas for a sequel and I have a couple other projects that I’m getting underway, but I would definitely like to come back to it, just because I think with a slightly bigger budget … there’s just so much more we could do with the Mexican Wrestling concept. You know, put him on some motorcycles, have some midget fights. there’s a lot to do with it. And I’d want to make it a little more of an action horror, just a real bloody action kind of film rather than so much of a slasher film that it was this time”.
