= List of Como dice el dicho episodes =

This is a list of Como dice el dicho episodes.

== Series overview ==
Season	Episodes	Originally released	
Season	Episodes	First released	Last released
1	68	February 1, 2011	December 15, 2011
2	76	January 17, 2012	December 11, 2012
3	66	January 15, 2013	December 10, 2013
4	66	January 30, 2014	December 11, 2014
5	66	January 15, 2015	December 15, 2015
6	155	January 13, 2016	December 22, 2016
7	157	January 16, 2017	December 21, 2017
8	150	January 8, 2018	November 28, 2018
9	138	January 8, 2019	December 21, 2019
10	155	January 8, 2020	December 16, 2020
11	TBA	January 12, 2021	TBA

== Episodes ==
=== Season 1 (2011) ===
No. overall	No. in season	Title	Original release date
1	1	"Del dicho al hecho"	February 1, 2011
Don Tomás' wife dies in the hospital. Isabel decides to go live with her grandfather and help him with his new coffee shop.
2	2	"Tanto peca el que mata la vaca"	February 3, 2011
Two brothers run over a child while driving drunk and leave him for dead, for fear of being accused of attempted murder.
3	3	"Vale más ladrón arrepentido"	February 8, 2011
Mauro leaves prison after serving a sentence for a crime he did not commit and returns home only to discover that his brother-in-law, Jacinto, is involved in illegal dealings with a foreign company.
4	4	"Ora veraz huarache..."	February 10, 2011
A young man who does not study or work is protected and overlapped by his mother, but he meets a young woman who will change him.
5	5	"Dile que es hermosa..."	February 17, 2011
A young painter wants to get the best model for the annual nude portrait contest at the academy where he studies.
6	6	"Al que Dios no le da hijos..."	February 22, 2011
A man conquers women, when his brother dies he takes care of his nieces, coming to love them and feel a fatherly love that he never thought to feel.
7	7	"Donde hubo fuego..."	February 24, 2011
A couple is about to get married but the loving memories of him will not let him fulfill his goals of being happy next to another woman.
8	8	"Más vale solo..."	March 1, 2011
Javier is very much in love with his girlfriend Lulu. He is heartbroken when he finds out that she is cheating on him with his best friend. He resumes his life and becomes a successful man.
9	9	"A cada uno le toca escoger..."	March 3, 2011
Poncho leaves his house because his stepfather mistreated him, his grandmother goes looking for him, but he does not want to return with his family and he meets a woman who uses him to steal alongside other street children.
10	10	"El lobo pierde el pelo..."	March 8, 2011
Ernesto, Isabel's ex-boyfriend, insists on reconciling with her, making her second-guess herself. Don Tomás does not approve of his granddaughter's relationship with the young man.
11	11	"Compadre que no llega a las caderas..."	March 10, 2011
Isela does not support Chente, her husband's friend, whom she points out as a lazy guy.
12	12	"Lo que se hereda no se hurta..."	March 15, 2011
13	13	"Del odio al amor..."	March 17, 2011
A young man is evicted from his home because his mother mortgaged it and never made any payment. When his mother suffers an accident and loses her memory, he believes that she has abandoned him, so his neighbors help him and give him lodging in their house.
14	14	"Agua que no has de beber..."	March 22, 2011
A young man sees his life change when he starts a whirlwind romance with a young woman. She becomes pregnant and this causes his plans to change. Although he tries to support her, their lives take different paths.
15	15	"Lo que no fue en tu año..."	March 24, 2011
A newly married man begins to distrust his wife when he discovers that she hasn't told him her real name and is hiding a mysterious past.
16	16	"No es buena la venganza..."	March 29, 2011
Lucia wants Fabian to leave his wife to be with her, but when he fails to do so, she seeks revenge.
17	17	"Te conozco bacalao..."	March 31, 2011
Felipe tries to marry Isabel and have a son within a year, in order to collect an inheritance.
18	18	"Lo que de prisa se hace..."	April 5, 2011
Paco feels pressured to experiment with his sexuality and does not know how to react.
19	19	"Nadie sabe lo que tiene..."	April 7, 2011
A young man takes advantage of his girlfriend because she is very much in love with him. She does all his school work, while he cheats on her with other girls at the university.
20	20	"Árbol que crece torcido..."	April 12, 2011
A young man steals the wallet from a man who sells drugs, the man finds him and threatens his girlfriend so that the boy can return the money. The young man tells the truth to his uncle and they catch the drug dealers.
21	21	"Contigo la milpa es rancho..."	April 14, 2011
A young man returns to his village and learns that his father has died. The boy threatens a man when he discovers that he wants to abuse his girlfriend. The man kills the boy's mother to take their land, steals the girl and threatens the young man.
22	22	"Cara de beato..."	April 28, 2011
A young man owes money for drugs and decides to go live with his uncles in another city to escape, but they follow him to collect all the money he owes. The young man steals his aunt's card and takes out the money, but the collector takes it all away.
23	23	"Quien mucho amenaza..."	May 3, 2011
24	24	"Caras vemos..."	May 5, 2011
25	25	"El que con lobos anda..."	May 12, 2011
26	26	"Ten cuidado con lo que deseas..."	May 17, 2011
27	27	"El que quiere la flor..."	May 19, 2011
28	28	"Tener miedo es de prudentes..."	May 24, 2011
29	29	"El valiente vive..."	May 26, 2011
30	30	"Amor de lejos..."	May 31, 2011
31	31	"Diablo te hiciste..."	June 2, 2011
32	32	"Cría cuervos..."	June 7, 2011
33	33	"Antes de armas tomar..."	June 9, 2011
34	34	"Ojos que no ven..."	June 14, 2011
35	35	"Hijo eres, padre serás"	June 16, 2011
36	36	"Dime de qué presumes"	June 30, 2011
37	37	"Nada mejor en la vida..."	July 5, 2011
38	38	"No hay mal..."	July 7, 2011
39	39	"A caballo regalado..."	July 12, 2011
40	40	"Al que no habla..."	July 14, 2011
41	41	"El momento más oscuro..."	July 19, 2011
42	42	"No dejes para mañana..."	July 21, 2011
43	43	"El diablo abre la puerta..."	July 26, 2011
44	44	"No por miedo a fallar..."	July 28, 2011
45	45	"Más vale prevenir..."	August 4, 2011
46	46	"El muerto y el arrimado..."	August 9, 2011
47	47	"Donde entra mucho vino..."	August 11, 2011
48	48	"Del agua mansa..."	August 16, 2011
49	49	"Donde tiene el tesoro..."	August 23, 2011
50	50	"Hijo de tigre..."	August 30, 2011
51	51	"Nadie sabe lo que está en la olla..."	September 1, 2011
52	52	"El que a hierro mata..."	September 8, 2011
53	53	"El que es buen gallo"	September 20, 2011
54	54	"Dios retarda la justicia"	September 22, 2011
55	55	"La unión hace la fuerza..."	September 29, 2011
56	56	"No todo lo que brilla es oro..."	October 4, 2011
57	57	"Nunca es tarde para hacer el bien..."	October 11, 2011
58	58	"La vida es corta y no retoña..."	October 13, 2011
59	59	"Nada en exceso todo con medida..."	October 20, 2011
60	60	"Las mentiras tienen las piernas cortas: Part 1"	October 25, 2011
61	61	"Las mentiras tienen las piernas cortas: Part 2"	October 27, 2011
62	62	"Haz el bien..."	November 1, 2011
63	63	"Es una locura amar"	November 10, 2011
64	64	"Amigo en la adversidad, amigo de verdad"	November 15, 2011
65	65	"Quien calla otorga...: Part 1"	November 22, 2011
66	66	"Quien calla otorga...: Part 2"	November 24, 2011
67	67	"De los parientes como el sol..."	December 6, 2011
68	68	"Por nochebuena y Navidad..."	December 15, 2011

=== Season 2 (2012) ===
No. overall	No. in season	Title	Original release date
69	1	"Cuando el tecolote canta"	January 17, 2012
70	2	"El que por su gusto es buey"	January 19, 2012
71	3	"Lo que mal empieza mal acaba"	January 24, 2012
72	4	"El hombre es fuego, la mujer estopa..."	January 26, 2012
73	5	"Me he de comer esa tuna..."	January 31, 2012
74	6	"La dicha reúne..."	February 2, 2012
75	7	"El que esté libre de culpa..."	February 7, 2012
76	8	"Quien siembra vientos..."	February 9, 2012
77	9	"El amor que se hace nudo"	February 14, 2012
78	10	"Cada oveja con su pareja..."	February 16, 2012
79	11	"Siempre hay un roto para un descosido..."	February 21, 2012
80	12	"Las apariencias engañan..."	February 23, 2012
81	13	"El que la hace la paga"	February 28, 2012
82	14	"La familia que crece unida..."	March 1, 2012
83	15	"Aunque la mona se vista de seda..."	March 6, 2012
84	16	"El que tiene más saliva traga más pinole..."	March 8, 2012
85	17	"Fue sin querer queriendo..."	March 13, 2012
86	18	"Ahora es cuando chile verde..."	March 15, 2012
87	19	"De tal palo, tal astilla..."	March 20, 2012
88	20	"Más vale tarde que nunca"	March 22, 2012
89	21	"Hechos son amores y no buenas razones..."	March 27, 2012
90	22	"No tiene la culpa el indio..."	March 29, 2012
91	23	"En casa del ladrón..."	April 17, 2012
92	24	"La mentira dura..."	April 19, 2012
93	25	"Aunque la jaula sea de oro..."	April 24, 2012
94	26	"Pa' decir mentiras y comer pescado hay que tener mucho cuidado"	April 26, 2012
95	27	"Cada cual carga la cruz de su parroquia"	May 3, 2012
96	28	"Mientras haya vida..."	May 8, 2012
97	29	"Un clavo saca otro clavo"	May 17, 2012
98	30	"Al mal tiempo buena cara"	May 22, 2012
99	31	"Candil de la calle"	May 24, 2012
100	32	"Si del cielo te caen limones..."	May 29, 2012
101	33	"Dios aprieta pero no ahorca"	June 5, 2012
102	34	"Nadie escarmienta en cabeza ajena..."	June 7, 2012
103	35	"Quién vengarse quiere..."	June 12, 2012
104	36	"Amor de padre..."	June 14, 2012
105	37	"El que nace pa' maceta..."	June 19, 2012
106	38	"El hambre me tira pero el orgullo me levanta"	June 21, 2012
107	39	"Quién no oye el consejo..."	June 28, 2012
108	40	"Piensa el ladrón..."	July 3, 2012
109	41	"No hay plazo que no se cumpla"	July 5, 2012
110	42	"Quien mal anda..."	July 10, 2012
111	43	"Cuídame de mis amigos..."	July 12, 2012
112	44	"El bien no es conocido..."	July 19, 2012
113	45	"Ladrón que roba ladrón..."	July 26, 2012
114	46	"Arboles y amores..."	August 14, 2012
115	47	"No hagas cosas buenas..."	August 16, 2012
116	48	"No hay mal que dure cien años..."	August 21, 2012
117	49	"Al que no ha usado huaraches..."	August 23, 2012
118	50	"El cerdo no suelta la manteca..."	August 28, 2012
119	51	"Primero el deber, luego..."	August 30, 2012
120	52	"Mas vale feo..."	September 4, 2012
121	53	"Cuando el rió suena..."	September 6, 2012
122	54	"El que se fue a la villa..."	September 18, 2012
123	55	"Cayendo el muerto..."	September 20, 2012
124	56	"Despacio que voy deprisa"	September 25, 2012
125	57	"Dime de que presumes y te diré de que careces"	September 27, 2012
126	58	"Más hace el que quiere..."	October 4, 2012
127	59	"Uno nunca sabe para quién trabaja"	October 9, 2012
128	60	"No le pidas peras al olmo"	October 11, 2012
129	61	"Quien más tiene más quiere"	October 16, 2012
130	62	"Amor con amor se paga"	October 18, 2012
131	63	"Cuando vea las barbas..."	October 23, 2012
132	64	"Quien se fía de un lobo..."	October 25, 2012
133	65	"Hasta al mejor cocinero..."	October 30, 2012
134	66	"El que quiere, puede"	November 6, 2012
135	67	"El más amigo es traidor"	November 8, 2012
136	68	"La palabra es plata..."	November 13, 2012
137	69	"El miedo es natural..."	November 15, 2012
138	70	"Donde hay migas..."	November 20, 2012
139	71	"La venganza no borra la ofensa"	November 22, 2012
140	72	"Cuando los que mandan pierden la vergüenza"	November 27, 2012
141	73	"El que busca encuentra..."	November 29, 2012
142	74	"Por lo que se ve..."	December 4, 2012
143	75	"Ni tanto que queme al santo..."	December 6, 2012
144	76	"Cuídate de los buenos..."	December 11, 2012

=== Season 3 (2013) ===
No. overall	No. in season	Title	Original release date
145	1	"A grandes males..."	January 15, 2013
146	2	"Más vale amar y perder..."	January 17, 2013
147	3	"El hombre propone..."	January 22, 2013
148	4	"Al mal paso..."	January 24, 2013
149	5	"El amor y el dolor..."	January 29, 2013
150	6	"Los mirones son de palo..."	January 31, 2013
151	7	"El que nace barrigón..."	February 5, 2013
152	8	"Hombre prevenido..."	February 7, 2013
153	9	"El que tenga tienda..."	February 12, 2013
154	10	"Las decisiones de hoy..."	February 19, 2013
155	11	"Quien juega con fuego..."	February 21, 2013
156	12	"Matrimonio y mortaja..."	February 26, 2013
157	13	"La venganza cava dos tumbas"	February 28, 2013
158	14	"No por mucho madrugar..."	March 5, 2013
159	15	"Entre abogados te veas"	March 7, 2013
160	16	"A la guerra sin fusil: Parte 1"	March 12, 2013
161	17	"A la guerra sin fusil: Parte 2"	March 14, 2013
162	18	"No hay rosas sin espinas"	March 19, 2013
163	19	"Quien hace un mal..."	March 21, 2013
164	20	"Las pistolas las carga el diablo"	April 9, 2013
165	21	"Gallo que no canta..."	April 11, 2013
166	22	"Más pronto cae un hablador..."	April 16, 2013
167	23	"Piensa mal y acertarás"	April 18, 2013
168	24	"Donde manda capitán..."	April 23, 2013
169	25	"El que no transa..."	April 25, 2013
170	26	"La cuerda siempre se rompe..."	May 7, 2013
171	27	"Tanto va el cántaro al agua..."	May 14, 2013
172	28	"El que tira la piedra..."	May 16, 2013
173	29	"Quien bien te quiere..."	May 21, 2013
174	30	"Lo pasado al olvido..."	May 23, 2013
175	31	"No hay peor ciego..."	May 28, 2013
176	32	"A cordero extraño..."	May 30, 2013
177	33	"Al que le pique..."	June 4, 2013
178	34	"A la muerte, ni temerle ni buscarla..."	June 6, 2013
179	35	"Más sabe el diablo..."	June 11, 2013
180	36	"El que quiera azul celeste..."	June 13, 2013
181	37	"A la herradura que suena..."	June 20, 2013
182	38	"En las penas y afanes..."	June 25, 2013
183	39	"El casado casa quiere"	June 27, 2013
184	40	"O bien callado o bien vengado"	July 2, 2013
185	41	"De lo perdido..."	July 4, 2013
186	42	"Jugar con fuego..."	July 16, 2013
187	43	"Como el hierro a la herrumbre..."	July 18, 2013
188	44	"La suerte de la fea..."	July 25, 2013
189	45	"Dios tarda, pero no olvida"	July 30, 2013
190	46	"Al nopal van a verlo..."	August 1, 2013
191	47	"El oro luce pero la virtud reluce"	August 8, 2013
192	48	"El que te quiere..."	August 15, 2013
193	49	"Zapatero a tus zapatos"	August 20, 2013
194	50	"Un acomedido..."	August 22, 2013
195	51	"Quien nada debe, nada teme"	August 29, 2013
196	52	"Amor grande vence mil dificultades"	September 5, 2013
197	53	"Quien canta sus males espanta"	September 12, 2013
198	54	"No hay pillo..."	September 19, 2013
199	55	"A lo hecho pecho"	September 26, 2013
200	56	"Los deseos se cumplen..."	October 8, 2013
201	57	"Si por bueno te tienes..."	October 10, 2013
202	58	"Con paciencia todo se logra"	October 15, 2013
203	59	"No hay fecha que no se cumpla"	October 17, 2013
204	60	"Como te ves, me ví..."	October 29, 2013
205	61	"Amor y odio..."	November 7, 2013
206	62	"Sobre advertencia..."	November 14, 2013
207	63	"Nunca tengas miedo del día..."	November 21, 2013
208	64	"Cuando la calumnia no mancha"	November 28, 2013
209	65	"Abril encapulla las rosas..."	December 5, 2013
210	66	"Lo que es para ti..."	December 10, 2013

=== Season 4 (2014) ===
No. overall	No. in season	Title	Original release date
211	1	"Después de la lluvia neblina..."	January 30, 2014
212	2	"El tiempo todo lo alcanza..."	February 4, 2014
213	3	"El amor no termina..."	February 6, 2014
214	4	"Cuando una rama se seca..."	February 13, 2014
215	5	"Por las hojas se conoce al tamal..."	February 18, 2014
216	6	"Cada quien se pone la corona..."	February 25, 2014
217	7	"Nada es verdad, nada es mentira"	February 27, 2014
218	8	"Penas que no sueltas..."	March 4, 2014
219	9	"Buena es la justicia..."	March 6, 2014
220	10	"En la cama y en la cárcel..."	March 13, 2014
221	11	"Quien haga mal espera tal"	March 20, 2014
222	12	"Lo que uno no puede ver en su casa..."	March 25, 2014
223	13	"Cada quien es arquitecto..."	March 27, 2014
224	14	"Bástele a cada día su afán"	April 1, 2014
225	15	"A fuerza ni los zapatos entran"	April 3, 2014
226	16	"Apuesta ilegal..."	April 8, 2014
227	17	"Una sola mano no aplaude"	April 10, 2014
228	18	"Ni ausente sin culpa..."	April 29, 2014
229	19	"Nunca juzgues a un libro..."	May 1, 2014
230	20	"Tengamos paz y moriremos viejos"	May 6, 2014
231	21	"Trece y martes..."	May 13, 2014
232	22	"Al que miedo tiene..."	May 15, 2014
233	23	"Un mal pensamiento vuelto acción..."	May 22, 2014
234	24	"Quien hace un cesto, hace ciento"	May 27, 2014
235	25	"Hasta no ver, no creer"	May 29, 2014
236	26	"No hay guapo sin defecto..."	June 5, 2014
237	27	"Jugar y nunca perder..."	June 10, 2014
238	28	"La conciencia vale más..."	June 19, 2014
239	29	"Ni bebas agua que no veas..."	June 24, 2014
240	30	"Quien no vive para servir..."	June 26, 2014
241	31	"Cuando una puerta se cierra..."	July 1, 2014
242	32	"Antes de hacer nada..."	July 10, 2014
243	33	"La venganza dura un día..."	July 15, 2014
244	34	"Por uno que salga chueco..."	July 17, 2014
245	35	"Cuando la pobreza entra por la puerta..."	July 24, 2014
246	36	"Culpa no tiene quien hace lo que debe"	July 31, 2014
247	37	"Pagan justos por pecadores"	August 5, 2014
248	38	"Cada quien busca su cebolla..."	August 7, 2014
249	39	"Son más los truenos que el agua"	August 14, 2014
250	40	"La manzana podrida pierde a su compañía"	August 19, 2014
251	41	"No muestres ni al más amigo..."	August 21, 2014
252	42	"El perdón cura lo que la mentira daña"	August 28, 2014
253	43	"La carga echa a andar al burro"	September 2, 2014
254	44	"Esperanza que consuela..."	September 4, 2014
255	45	"El que teme sufrir..."	September 9, 2014
256	46	"El dinero no da la felicidad"	September 11, 2014
257	47	"Mira por donde vas"	September 18, 2014
258	48	"El buen juez por su casa empieza"	September 23, 2014
259	49	"Ninguno que beba vino..."	September 25, 2014
260	50	"Cuando el plato tiene dueño"	September 30, 2014
261	51	"Explicación no pedida"	October 2, 2014
262	52	"Pies para qué los quiero"	October 9, 2014
263	53	"En este mundo traidor"	October 14, 2014
264	54	"A cada capillita"	October 16, 2014
265	55	"El tiempo todo lo cura"	October 21, 2014
266	56	"Antes son mis dientes"	October 23, 2014
267	57	"La avaricia y la ambición"	October 30, 2014
268	58	"No vale la pena llorar"	November 4, 2014
269	59	"Bueno es beber"	November 6, 2014
270	60	"Cuando la limosna es grande"	November 11, 2014
271	61	"En boca del mentiroso"	November 18, 2014
272	62	"Ave vieja, no entra en jaula"	November 25, 2014
273	63	"El que de su casa se aleja"	December 2, 2014
274	64	"El que nunca ha tenido y llega a tener"	December 4, 2014
275	65	"Perro que ladra"	December 9, 2014
276	66	"El que no tiene qué hacer"	December 11, 2014

=== Season 5 (2015) ===
No. overall	No. in season	Title	Original release date
277	1	"El que no conoce a Dios..."	January 15, 2015
278	2	"Para verdades el tiempo..."	January 22, 2015
279	3	"Hijos chicos, chicos dolores..."	January 29, 2015
280	4	"Nadie, por hambre que tenga..."	February 3, 2015
281	5	"El oro hace poderoso..."	February 5, 2015
282	6	"Cuando Dios cierra todas las puertas..."	February 12, 2015
283	7	"El que se enaltece..."	February 17, 2015
284	8	"De enero a enero..."	February 19, 2015
285	9	"Si te he visto, no me acuerdo"	February 26, 2015
286	10	"Quien adelante no mira..."	March 3, 2015
287	11	"Cuando la flecha va al pecho..."	March 5, 2015
288	12	"En boca cerrada..."	March 12, 2015
289	13	"Si te protege la luna, no te preocupes"	March 17, 2015
290	14	"La madre y el delantal"	March 19, 2015
291	15	"La curiosidad mató al gato..."	March 24, 2015
292	16	"Es tan difícil decir la verdad..."	March 26, 2015
293	17	"Dime con quién andas..."	April 14, 2015
294	18	"De todos huí menos de mí..."	April 16, 2015
295	19	"Un padre supone más..."	April 21, 2015
296	20	"Ya la esperanza perdida..."	April 23, 2015
297	21	"Al país que fueres..."	April 28, 2015
298	22	"Ni pichas, ni cachas..."	May 5, 2015
299	23	"El amor todo lo puede"	May 12, 2015
300	24	"El que calla, otorga"	May 14, 2015
301	25	"Más vale buena esperanza..."	May 21, 2015
302	26	"La esperanza es lo último que muere"	May 26, 2015
303	27	"Por muy larga que sea la noche..."	May 28, 2015
304	28	"Al que al cielo escupe..."	June 2, 2015
305	29	"Quien todo lo quiere..."	June 4, 2015
306	30	"No juzgues a tus semejantes..."	June 11, 2015
307	31	"A las palabras se las lleva el viento"	June 18, 2015
308	32	"No me tientes, Satanás"	June 25, 2015
309	33	"No hay más brava cosa..."	June 30, 2015
310	34	"A quien teme al Dios..."	July 2, 2015
311	35	"Mientras cuentas las estrellas..."	July 9, 2015
312	36	"Más vale paso que dure..."	July 16, 2015
313	37	"En el pecado lleva la penitencia"	July 23, 2015
314	38	"Quien pobre anocheció..."	July 28, 2015
315	39	"El que ríe al último..."	July 30, 2015
316	40	"Más vale poco y bien allegado..."	August 4, 2015
317	41	"La desconfianza y el amor no comen del mismo plato"	August 6, 2015
318	42	"El león no es como lo pintan"	August 13, 2015
319	43	"Celos y envidia..."	August 27, 2015
320	44	"Entre padres y hermanos..."	September 1, 2015
321	45	"Ya no quiero queso..."	September 3, 2015
322	46	"Qué importa el color del gato..."	September 8, 2015
323	47	"Vale más ser envidiada..."	September 10, 2015
324	48	"Quien enferma de locura..."	September 22, 2015
325	49	"Lo que mucho se alaba..."	September 24, 2015
326	50	"No hay enemigo pequeño"	October 1, 2015
327	51	"Calza mocasines y deja huella..."	October 6, 2015
328	52	"Amigo y de fiel empeño..."	October 8, 2015
329	53	"El que de santo resbala..."	October 15, 2015
330	54	"Lo prometido es deuda"	October 22, 2015
331	55	"Si buena me la hizo..."	October 29, 2015
332	56	"De la moda, lo que te acomoda"	November 5, 2015
333	57	"Nunca digas de esta agua..."	November 10, 2015
334	58	"Dios no les da alas a los alacranes"	November 12, 2015
335	59	"El que la sigue la consigue"	November 19, 2015
336	60	"¿Hijo de gata caza ratones?"	November 24, 2015
337	61	"Nunca digas nunca"	November 26, 2015
338	62	"Un ojo al gato y otro al garabato"	December 1, 2015
339	63	"A más hjos, más litigios"	December 3, 2015
340	64	"La cadena siempre se rompe..."	December 8, 2015
341	65	"Quien a su hijo consiente..."	December 10, 2015
342	66	"Dios los cría y ellos se juntan"	December 15, 2015

=== Season 6 (2016) ===
No. overall	No. in season	Title	Original release date
343	1	"Ilusiones rápidas, sufrimientos largos"	January 13, 2016
344	2	"A Dios rogando y con el mazo dando"	January 15, 2016
345	3	"El pudor de la doncella..."	January 18, 2016
346	4	"Le salió el tiro por la culata"	January 20, 2016
347	5	"Si la verdad no es entera, se convierte en aliada de lo falso"	January 22, 2016
348	6	"El que busca encuentra y el que quiere puede"	January 25, 2016
349	7	"Lo pasado, pasado... y lo mal hecho, perdonado"	January 27, 2016
350	8	"Pulque bendito, dulce tormento, ¿qué haces afuera?, vente pa' dentro"	January 29, 2016
351	9	"El que siembra su maíz, que se coma su pinole"	February 2, 2016
352	10	"El que por su gusto muere, hasta la muerte le sabe"	February 3, 2016
353	11	"Cría fama y échate a dormir"	February 5, 2016
354	12	"Hecha la ley, hecha la trampa"	February 8, 2016
355	13	"De las palabras no sonido, sino el sentido"	February 10, 2016
356	14	"El que nace pa tamal, del cielo le caen las hojas"	February 12, 2016
357	15	"Amor viejo ni te olvido ni te dejo"	February 15, 2016
358	16	"No es harina todo lo que blanquea"	February 17, 2016
359	17	"Quien vive con compañía vive con alegría"	February 18, 2016
360	18	"De músico, poeta y loco todos tenemos un poco"	February 19, 2016
361	19	"Arrieros somos y en el camino andamos"	February 22, 2016
362	20	"Ni bonita que admire, ni fea que espante"	February 24, 2016
363	21	"Hay que agarrar al toro por los cuernos"	February 26, 2016
364	22	"Ir contra corriente, no es de hombre prudente"	February 29, 2016
365	23	"El gallo será muy gallo, pero la gallina es la de los huevos"	March 2, 2016
366	24	"La verdad a medias es una mentira completa"	March 4, 2016
367	25	"Del mal juicio, la experiencia, y de ésta, el buen juicio"	March 7, 2016
368	26	"Quien no castiga al mal, ordena que se haga"	March 9, 2016
369	27	"En la vida y en la cancha, siempre hay revancha"	March 11, 2016
370	28	"Justicia quiero yo, más por mi casa no"	March 14, 2016
371	29	"Quien de la culebra está mordido, de la sombra se espanta"	March 16, 2016
372	30	"Corazón de codicioso, no tiene reposo"	March 17, 2016
373	31	"De que lloren en mi casa a que lloren en la tuya, mejor que lloren en la tuya"	March 18, 2016
374	32	"Para qué te metes de payaso, si no aguantas las carcajadas"	March 22, 2016
375	33	"No le busques tres pies al gato"	March 23, 2016
376	34	"Quien envidioso vive, desesperado muere"	March 25, 2016
377	35	"De ningún laberinto propio, se sale con llave ajena"	March 30, 2016
378	36	"Si amas algo déjalo libre, si regresa es tuyo, si no, nunca lo fue"	March 31, 2016
379	37	"A la larga todo se sabe"	April 1, 2016
380	38	"Al que no le cuesta, lo quiere volver fiesta"	April 5, 2016
381	39	"La cruz en los pechos y el diablo en los hechos"	April 6, 2016
382	40	"No hay peor lucha que la que no se hace"	April 7, 2016
383	41	"Amo de lo que callas, esclavo de lo que dices"	April 12, 2016
384	42	"La vida es lo que pasa, mientras haces otros planes"	April 13, 2016
385	43	"Habla siempre lo que debas y calla siempre lo que puedas"	April 14, 2016
386	44	"Al que obra mal, mal le va"	April 19, 2016
387	45	"A Dios, al padre, y al maestro, tenga el niño gran respeto"	April 20, 2016
388	46	"Lo que tiene que suceder, sucederá"	April 22, 2016
389	47	"Donde reina el amor, sobran las leyes"	April 25, 2016
390	48	"El hombre es como el oso: cuanto más feo, más hermoso"	April 27, 2016
391	49	"El que persevera alcanza"	April 28, 2016
392	50	"Para hacer una casa o domar un potro, mejor que lo haga otro"	April 29, 2016
393	51	"A mucho amor, mucho perdón"	May 2, 2016
394	52	"Soñaba el ciego que veía y soñaba lo que quería"	May 4, 2016
395	53	"A donde el corazón se inclina, el pie camina"	May 5, 2016
396	54	"Descuelga al ahorcado y por él serás colgado"	May 9, 2016
397	55	"Después de la tempestad, viene la calma"	May 11, 2016
398	56	"La pulga tras la oreja con el diablo se aconseja"	May 13, 2016
399	57	"Bien aprende quien buen maestro tiene"	May 17, 2016
400	58	"La vida es corta y ser feliz es lo que importa"	May 18, 2016
401	59	"Sólo las ollas conocen los hervores de sus caldos"	May 19, 2016
402	60	"Camarón que se duerme, se lo lleva la corriente"	May 24, 2016
403	61	"En el país de los ciegos, el tuerto es rey"	May 25, 2016
404	62	"Predicar con el ejemplo es el mejor argumento"	May 26, 2016
405	63	"A quien vive pobre por morir rico, llámele borrico"	May 27, 2016
406	64	"Ver para creer"	May 31, 2016
407	65	"Vale más pan con amor, que gallina con dolor"	June 1, 2016
408	66	"Con una brasa se puede quemar la casa"	June 3, 2016
409	67	"El hombre experimentado, es hombre viejo y gastado"	June 7, 2016
410	68	"El amor y la felicidad no se pueden ocultar"	June 8, 2016
411	69	"Al buen amanecer, no te lo dejes perder"	June 9, 2016
412	70	"Es bueno el encaje, pero no tan ancho"	June 10, 2016
413	71	"Para mentir y comer pescado, hay que tener mucho cuidado"	June 14, 2016
414	72	"No es lo mismo, pero es igual"	June 16, 2016
415	73	"Ama a quien no te ama, responde a quien no te llama, y andarás carrera vana"	June 20, 2016
416	74	"Abre la puerta a la pereza y entrará a tu casa la pobreza"	June 21, 2016
417	75	"A reír y a gozar que el mundo se va a acabar"	June 23, 2016
418	76	"Más vale poco y bueno, que mucho y malo"	June 24, 2016
419	77	"Males comunicados, suelen ser remediados"	June 29, 2016
420	78	"Entre broma y broma, la verdad se asoma"	June 30, 2016
421	79	"Con amigos así, ¿quién necesita enemigos?"	July 4, 2016
422	80	"Los dichos de los viejitos, son evangelios chiquitos"	July 5, 2016
423	81	"Jaulas y cárceles ni para los ángeles"	July 6, 2016
424	82	"Acciones son amores, no besos y apachurrones"	July 8, 2016
425	83	"Cárceles y caminos, hacen amigos"	July 13, 2016
426	84	"Donde fuego se hace, humo sale"	July 14, 2016
427	85	"Dejar lo cierto por lo dudoso, puede ser peligroso"	July 15, 2016
428	86	"La novedad es flor de un día, hoy ya no luce lo que ayer lucía"	July 18, 2016
429	87	"Al hombre osado la fortuna le da la mano"	July 20, 2016
430	88	"El hábito no hace al monje"	July 27, 2016
431	89	"Quien no cree a buena madre, cree a mala madrastra"	July 28, 2016
432	90	"Cuando sabes lo que siembras, no le tienes miedo a la cosecha"	July 29, 2016
433	91	"Más vale solo andar, que mal casar"	August 1, 2016
434	92	"Cuando el diablo reza, engañar quiere"	August 3, 2016
435	93	"Quien por malos caminos anda, malos abrojos halla"	August 8, 2016
436	94	"A fácil perdón, frecuente ladrón"	August 9, 2016
437	95	"Una caída más, es una caída menos"	August 10, 2016
438	96	"Al ojo del amo, engorda el caballo"	August 11, 2016
439	97	"Al peligro con tiento; y al remedio, con tiempo"	August 12, 2016
440	98	"Juventud sin salud, más amarga que la senectud"	August 17, 2016
441	99	"Yerros de amor, dignos son de perdón"	August 19, 2016
442	100	"A quien mal vive, su miedo le sigue"	August 22, 2016
443	101	"Más vale pedir perdón que pedir permiso"	August 23, 2016
444	102	"Antes de que te cases, mira con quien lo haces"	August 24, 2016
445	103	"Más vale una vez colorado, que cien descolorido"	August 25, 2016
446	104	"Doncellez y preñez, no pueden ser a la vez"	August 26, 2016
447	105	"En casa del pobre, el que no trabaja no come"	August 31, 2016
448	106	"El cobarde es león en su casa y liebre en la plaza"	September 1, 2016
449	107	"El muerto al pozo y el vivo al gozo"	September 2, 2016
450	108	"Como pecas, pagas"	September 6, 2016
451	109	"El tiempo perdido, hasta los santos lo lloran"	September 8, 2016
452	110	"Más vale pájaro en mano, que ciento volando"	September 9, 2016
453	111	"Amores, dolores y dineros no pueden estar secretos"	September 12, 2016
454	112	"Quien gasta y no gana, ¿de qué comerá mañana?"	September 14, 2016
455	113	"Al villano no hay que darle vara en mano"	September 19, 2016
456	114	"La vaca se olvida que fue ternero"	September 21, 2016
457	115	"Para aplaudir se necesitan dos manos"	September 23, 2016
458	116	"El que se casa, para su casa"	September 26, 2016
459	117	"La vida es dura pero madura"	September 29, 2016
450	118	"Es mejor encender una vela, que maldecir la oscuridad"	September 30, 2016
451	119	"En la guerra y en el amor todo se vale"	October 3, 2016
452	120	"El que por su gusto corre, nunca se cansa"	October 5, 2016
453	121	"Agua pasada no mueve molinos"	October 7, 2016
454	122	"Quien mucho abarca, poco aprieta"	October 10, 2016
455	123	"Más vale un hoy que dos mañanas"	October 12, 2016
456	124	"La zorra nunca se ve su cola"	October 13, 2016
457	125	"Hay ricos pobres y pobres ricos"	October 14, 2016
458	126	"Quien da pan a perro ajeno, pierde el pan y pierde el perro"	October 17, 2016
459	127	"Bebido el vino, perdido el tino"	October 19, 2016
460	128	"Quien beneficia a los malos, perjudica a los buenos"	October 20, 2016
461	129	"Quien no buscó amigos en la alegría, que en la desgracia no los pida"	October 21, 2016
462	130	"Debajo del agua mansa está la peor corriente"	October 24, 2016
463	131	"Los niños y los borrachos siempre dicen la verdad"	October 26, 2016
464	132	"Si crees que eres un león, no actúes como ratón"	October 31, 2016
465	133	"No hay árbol que el viento no haya sacudido"	November 1, 2016
466	134	"Cada quién es dueño de su miedo"	November 2, 2016
467	135	"El avión despega contra el viento, no a favor de él"	November 3, 2016
468	136	"El talento gana partidos, pero el trabajo en equipo y la inteligencia ganan campeonatos"	November 4, 2016
469	137	"El que limpio juega, limpio se queda"	November 9, 2016
470	138	"Con su propio corazón, cada quien juzga el ajeno"	November 14, 2016
471	139	"El que puede esperar, todo llega a alcanzar"	November 16, 2016
472	140	"Mucho teme quien bien ama"	November 18, 2016
473	141	"Cuando alguien visita, es porque algo necesita"	November 21, 2016
474	142	"Palabras melosas, siempre engañosas"	November 24, 2016
475	143	"Echando a perder se aprende"	November 25, 2016
476	144	"Hasta que es padecido, el mal no es conocido"	November 29, 2016
477	145	"El que a buen árbol se arrima, buena sombra le cobija"	November 30, 2016
478	146	"Para todos sale el sol, por más tarde que amanezca"	December 1, 2016
479	147	"Un diablo bien vestido por ángel es tenido"	December 5, 2016
480	148	"Obras son amores y no buenas razones"	December 6, 2016
481	149	"Pelillos a la mar, y lo pasado olvidar"	December 8, 2016
482	150	"Hay veces que nada el pato y hay veces que ni agua bebe"	December 12, 2016
483	151	"Hay maderas que no agarran el barniz"	December 13, 2016
484	152	"Amar no es sólo querer, también es comprender"	December 15, 2016
485	153	"Aunque sean del mismo barro, no es lo mismo bacín que jarro"	December 19, 2016
486	154	"Es mejor agitarse en la duda, que descansar en el error"	December 20, 2016
487	155	"No quieras correr antes de saber caminar"	December 22, 2016

=== Season 7 (2017) ===
No. overall	No. in season	Title	Original release date
488	1	"De una mentira ciento se derivan"	January 16, 2017
489	2	"Chango viejo no aprende maroma nueva"	January 18, 2017
490	3	"Por un beso empieza eso"	January 19, 2017
491	4	"Amar y saber, todo junto no puede ser"	January 23, 2017
492	5	"Libro cerrado no saca letrado"	January 25, 2017
493	6	"La venganza es un plato que se come frío"	January 26, 2017
494	7	"Un poquito y otro poquito, hacen un muchito"	January 30, 2017
495	8	"Corazón que no sufra dolores, pase la vida sin amores"	January 31, 2017
496	9	"Barba de tres colores, no la traen sino traidores"	February 1, 2017
497	10	"La ropa sucia se lava en casa"	February 2, 2017
498	11	"El mal entra a brazadas y sale a pulgaradas"	February 6, 2017
499	12	"No hay ausencia que mate, ni dolor que consuma"	February 7, 2017
500	13	"Amigo reconciliado, enemigo agazapado"	February 8, 2017
501	14	"El que algo quiere algo le cuesta"	February 10, 2017
502	15	"Juzgan los enamorados que los otros tienen los ojos vendados"	February 14, 2017
503	16	"Lo que se aprende en la cuna, hasta la sepultura dura"	February 15, 2017
504	17	"No hay mal que no tenga su peor"	February 17, 2017
505	18	"Padre millonario y trabajador, hijo vago y malgastador"	February 20, 2017
506	19	"Fácil es empezar y difícil perseverar"	February 21, 2017
507	20	"El que demonios da, demonios recibe"	February 23, 2017
508	21	"El que no quiere ver fantasmas que no salga de noche"	February 27, 2017
509	22	"La mula no era erisca, la hicieron a palos"	February 28, 2017
510	23	"Poquitos serán los que yerran queriendo errar"	March 1, 2017
511	24	"El pobre puede morir, lo que no puede es enfermarse"	March 2, 2017
512	25	"El pez por la boca muere"	March 6, 2017
513	26	"A borracho y mujeriego no les des a guardar dinero"	March 8, 2017
514	27	"Quien se alegra del mal del vecino, el suyo viene en camino"	March 9, 2017
515	28	"Mal de muchos, consuelo de tontos"	March 13, 2017
516	29	"Si quieres con tu familia reñir, echa algo a repartir"	March 15, 2017
517	30	"De poquito en poquito se llena el jarrito"	March 16, 2017
518	31	"Viendo la belleza, todo hombre tropieza"	March 20, 2017
519	32	"Más valle llegar a tiempo que rondar un año"	March 21, 2017
520	33	"A donde va Vicente, va toda la gente"	March 23, 2017
521	34	"Golpes hacen jinetes"	March 27, 2017
522	35	"Abiertas están las heridas del que desea la venganza"	March 29, 2017
523	36	"De glotones y tragones están llenos los panteones"	March 30, 2017
524	37	"Donde las dan, las toman"	April 3, 2017
525	38	"Las cañas devuelven lanzas"	April 5, 2017
526	39	"En casa de herrero, cuchillo de palo"	April 6, 2017
527	40	"El que nace para cigarra, muere cantando"	April 10, 2017
528	41	"Donde hay amor, hay dolor"	April 11, 2017
529	42	"Favor con favor se paga"	April 12, 2017
530	43	"Después de niño ahogado, tapan el pozo"	April 17, 2017
531	44	"Aquí se rompió una taza y cada quien para su casa"	April 18, 2017
532	45	"Tanto quiere el diablo a su hijo, hasta que le saca un ojo"	April 19, 2017
533	46	"No hay bonita sin pero, ni fea sin gracia"	April 20, 2017
534	47	"Acuérdate nuera, que también serás suegra"	April 24, 2017
535	48	"Con el afán se gana el pan"	April 26, 2017
536	49	"Amor y muerte, nada más fuerte"	April 27, 2017
537	50	"Al que madruga, Dios lo ayuda"	April 28, 2017
538	51	"Yerba mala nunca muere"	May 1, 2017
539	52	"El amor no se compra con dinero"	May 3, 2017
540	53	"El que a dos amos sirve con alguno queda mal"	May 4, 2017
541	54	"La verdad no peca, pero incomoda"	May 8, 2017
542	55	"Conviene al poderoso con el débil ser piadoso"	May 10, 2017
543	56	"Si el viento va en tu contra, aprende a volar"	May 11, 2017
544	57	"Quien desea aprender, pronto llegará a saber"	May 15, 2017
545	58	"Al mejor cazador se le va la liebre"	May 16, 2017
546	59	"Boca de verdades, temida en todas partes"	May 17, 2017
547	60	"Perro de buena raza hasta la muerte caza"	May 23, 2017
548	61	"Amigos de muchos años, dan los desengaños"	May 25, 2017
549	62	"Amor de madre que todo lo demás es aire"	May 26, 2017
550	63	"A gato viejo, ratón tierno"	May 29, 2017
551	64	"Ojos que te vieron ir, jamás te verán volver"	May 31, 2017
552	65	"El que es perico, donde quiera es verde"	June 2, 2017
553	66	"Costumbres y dineros hacen hijos caballeros"	June 6, 2017
554	67	"Cuando no hay amor, ni las cobijas calientan"	June 8, 2017
555	68	"A merced recibida, libertad perdida"	June 9, 2017
556	69	"A buen hambre, no hay pan duro"	June 13, 2017
557	70	"Quien no da de enamorado, menos da de arrepentido"	June 14, 2017
558	71	"Muchos arroyos hacen los ríos"	June 15, 2017
559	72	"Afortunado en el juego, desafortunado en el amor"	June 16, 2017
560	73	"Más vale maña que fuerza"	June 20, 2017
561	74	"Lo que mortifica ni se recuerda ni se platica"	June 21, 2017
562	75	"Más hace el lobo callando, que el perro ladrando"	June 23, 2017
563	76	"La claridad conserva la amistad"	June 26, 2017
564	77	"Quien tiene tejado de vidrio, que no le tire piedras al del vecino"	June 28, 2017
565	78	"La fe mueve montañas"	June 29, 2017
566	79	"Por un mal vecino, no deshagas tu nido"	July 3, 2017
567	80	"El casado descontento, siempre vive con tormento"	July 4, 2017
568	81	"Genio y figura hasta la sepultura"	July 5, 2017
569	82	"La envidia, dice el autor, es martillo destructor"	July 7, 2017
570	83	"Cada palo aguante su vela"	July 10, 2017
571	84	"Mal que no tiene cura, querer curar es locura"	July 11, 2017
572	85	"A palabras necias, oídos sordos"	July 13, 2017
573	86	"Todos somos valientes, hasta que la cucaracha vuela"	July 17, 2017
574	87	"A quien cuece y amasa, no le quites la hogaza"	July 19, 2017
575	88	"Aún no ensillamos y ya cabalgamos"	July 20, 2017
576	89	"No supe de duelos hasta que junté mis hijos con los tuyos"	July 21, 2017
577	90	"Lo que bien se aprende, nunca se olvida"	July 25, 2017
578	91	"Quien teme a la muerte, no goza la vida"	July 26, 2017
579	92	"Bien reza quien en servir a Dios piensa"	July 27, 2017
580	93	"Cuídate de la gente buena, que la mala Diosito te la señala"	July 31, 2017

=== Season 11 (2021) ===
No. overall	No. in season	Title	Original release date	Mexico viewers (millions)
1098	1	"No hay cosa oculta que no se descubra"	January 18, 2021	2.9
1099	2	"El miedo es como la argolla, no se le encuentra la punta"	January 20, 2021	3.5
1100	3	"No hagas a otros el mal que no quieras para ti"	January 21, 2021	3.1
1101	4	"La esperanza del perdón alienta al pillo y al ladrón"	January 12, 2021	3.1
1102	5	"Atajar al principio el mal procura, si llega a echar raíz, tarde se cura"	January 13, 2021	3.3
1103	6	"De ovejas blancas nacen corderos negros"	January 14, 2021	3.3
1104	7	"Más vale atole con risas que chocolate con lágrimas"	January 26, 2021	2.8
1105	8	"Botellita de jerez, todo lo que digas será al revés"	January 27, 2021	3.1
1106	9	"Los toros se ven mejor desde la barrera"	January 28, 2021	3.0
1107	10	"Favor ofrecido, compromiso contraído"	February 1, 2021	N/A
1108	11	"Una pena entre dos es menos atroz"	February 3, 2021	N/A
1109	12	"Caballo que va rápido no es fácil de conocer"	February 5, 2021	N/A
1110	13	"Querer sin ser querido es amor y tiempo perdido"	February 17, 2021	N/A
1111	14	"No es bueno desvestir un santo para vestir otro”"	February 8, 2021	N/A
1112	15	"Es más fácil perdonar a un enemigo que a un amigo"	February 11, 2021	N/A
1113	16	"Al que anda entre miel, algo se le pega"	February 9, 2021	N/A
1114	17	"Para criar, los padres; para malcriar, los abuelos"	February 10, 2021	N/A
1115	18	"Hay que vivirlo para luego decirlo"	February 16, 2021	N/A
1116	19	"El corazón no envejece, el cuero es el que se arruga"	February 15, 2021	N/A
1117	20	"Quien mucho se ausenta, pronto deja de hacer falta"	February 18, 2021	N/A
1118	21	"Más vale amigo, que pariente ni primo"	February 22, 2021	N/A
1119	22	"Toma chocolate, paga lo que debes"	February 23, 2021	N/A
1120	23	"Éramos muchos y parió la abuela"	February 24, 2021	N/A
