= Vas o No Vas (Mexican game show) =

Mexican television game show

Vas o No Vas (English: Go or No Go) is the Mexican version of Deal or No Deal, broadcast by Televisa. The original version was transmitted on Saturday nights, however episodes are now also broadcast on weekday evenings. While the weekend version shows a more solemn environment (with a top prize of 5,000,000 pesos, about US$262,500), the weekday version seems more informal and fun (with a top prize of 1,000,000 pesos, about US$52,500). Héctor Sandarti presents the show, and he has also done the Spanish-language American version (using the same title) for Telemundo.

== Case values ==
=== Daily version ===
Three cases contain non-monetary items. One has a value between $1 and $10, another between $10 and $50, and one more between $50 and $200.

$1
Object
$10
Object
$50
Object
$200
$500
$1,000
$2,000
$5,000

$10,000
$20,000
$25,000
$50,000
$75,000
$100,000
$200,000
$300,000
$400,000
$500,000
$1,000,000

=== Saturday Night version ===
$1
$5
$10
$15
$20
$50
$100
$200
$500
$1,000
$2,000
$2,500
$5,000

$7,500
$10,000
$25,000
$50,000
$100,000
$200,000
$300,000
$400,000
$500,000
$750,000
$1,000,000
$2,500,000
$5,000,000

== Yoo si vooy ==
The second version, called Yoo si vooy, was premiered in September 2009. It was hosted by Raúl Araiza Herrera. The top prize of the show is 2,500,000 pesos.

A contestant won only 1 peso after rejected the offer of 170,000 pesos. The other case had 350,000 pesos.

Board 1
$1	$15,000
$5	$25,000
$10	$35,000
$15	$50,000
$25	$75,000
$50	$100,000
$150	$150,000
$250	$200,000
$500	$250,000
$1,000	$350,000
$2,500	$500,000
$5,000	$1,250,000
$10,000	$2,500,000

Board 2
$1	$20,000
$5	$30,000
$10	$50,000
$25	$75,000
$50	$100,000
$100	$150,000
$250	$200,000
$500	$250,000
$1,000	$500,000
$2,500	$750,000
$5,000	$1,000,000
$10,000	$1,500,000
$15,000	$2,500,000
