= My Fair Brady =

- Genre: Reality
- Created by: Cris Abrego; Mark Cronin
- Starring: Christopher Knight; Adrianne Curry
- Composers: Adam Zekind; Dan Radlauer
- Country of origin: United States
- Original language: English
- No. of seasons: 3
- No. of episodes: 25

Production
- Executive producers: Cris Abrego; Mark Cronin; Ben Samek for VH1: Jeff Olde; Jill Modabber
- Producer: Lauren A. Stevens
- Cinematography: Bruce Ready; Dave Miller
- Running time: 23 minutes

Original release
- Network: VH1
- Release: September 11, 2005 – March 9, 2008

Related
- The Surreal Life

My Fair Brady is an American reality television series on VH1 that followed Christopher Knight, who played Peter Brady on The Brady Bunch, and Adrianne Curry, who won the first season of America's Next Top Model, a year after they met and fell in love on the reality show The Surreal Life.

The show appeared to have originated from a Season 4 episode of The Surreal Life, during which each cast member pitched a TV show idea to network executives. Adrianne's concept, which she called Beauty and the Brady, was a show about her and Knight's then-fledgling romance, in which she would attempt to convince Knight to marry her. Within that episode, Adrianne's idea was passed over in favor of that of castmate Da Brat, but the latter's show never came to fruition.

== Season 1 ==
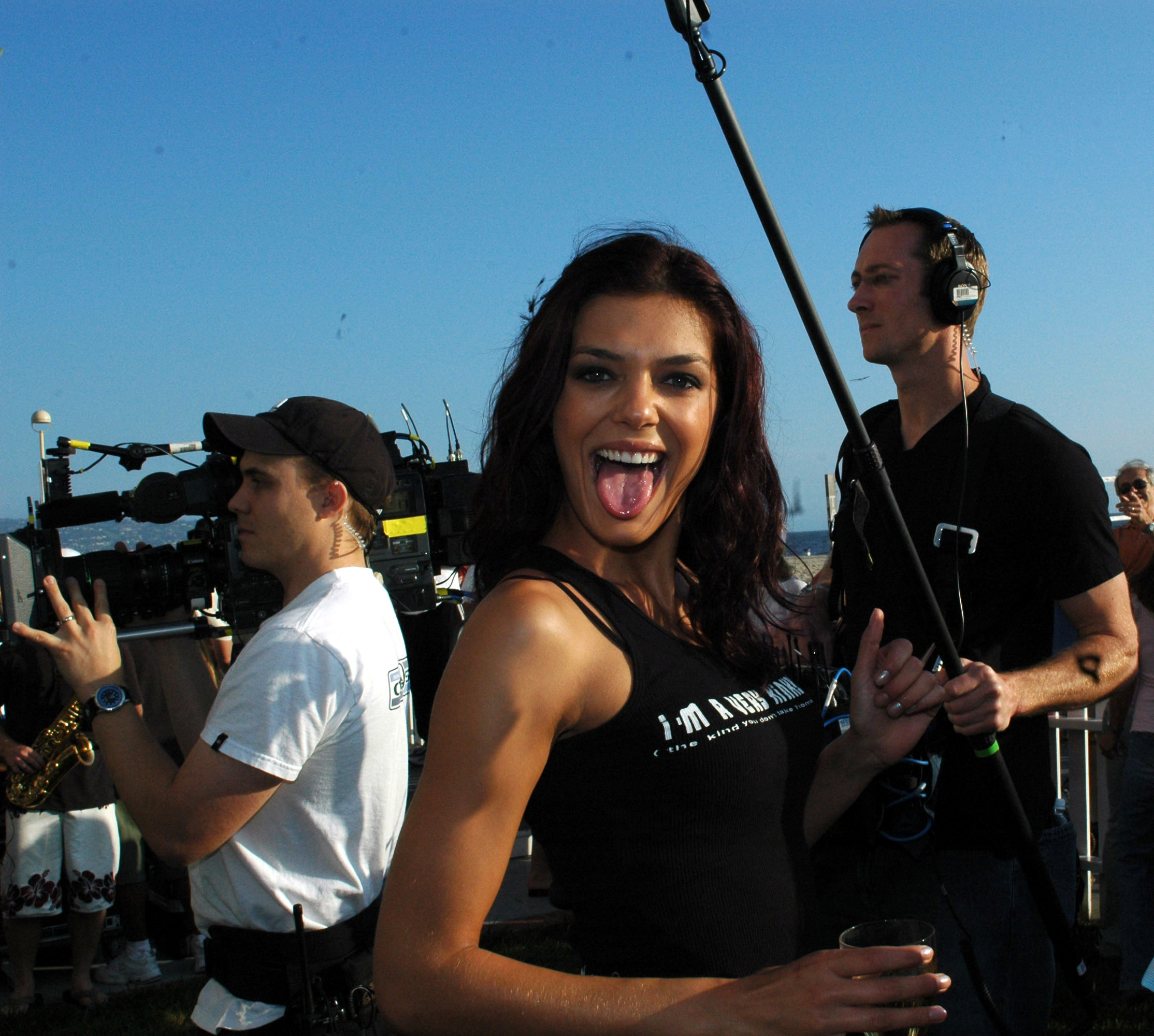
Adrianne Curry during filming of My Fair Brady

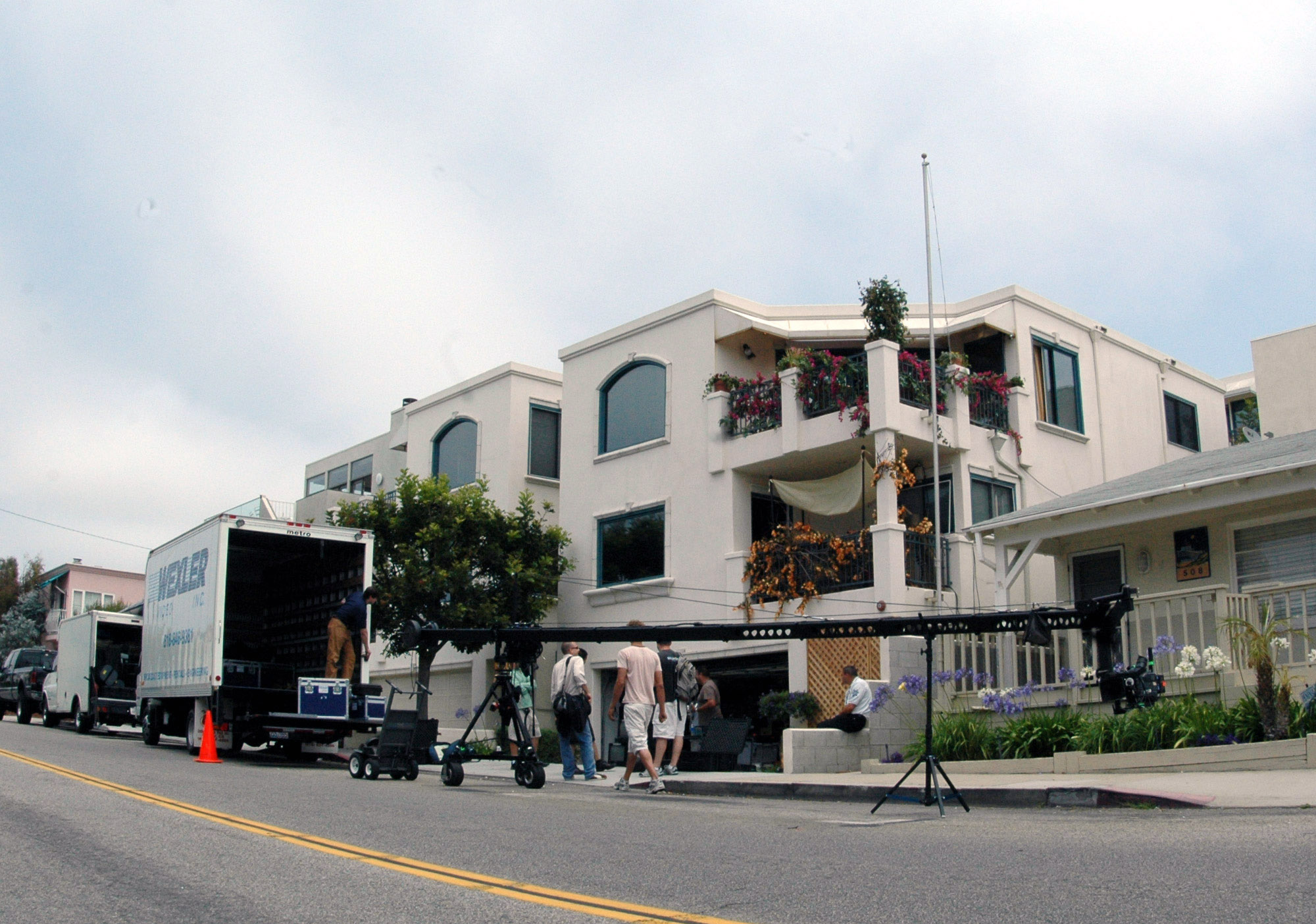
My Fair Brady production crew, season 1

The first season was filmed after Surreal Life Season 4 finished. In the last episode of that season, Knight had tentatively decided to start a relationship with Curry; nevertheless, during almost all the episodes he refused to formalize a relationship of any kind with her, acknowledging the difference in their ages. Some memorable moments are Florence Henderson visiting the couple, Curry partying with her best friend, and wearing a wedding dress without Knight's knowledge, who just watched her looking surprised. At the end of the first season, Christopher proposed to Adrianne.

== Season 2 ==
Entitled My Fair Brady: We're Getting Married!, the second season covered Christopher Knight and Adrianne Curry's preparations for the wedding. My Fair Brady: We're Getting Married! premiered on-air May 28, 2006. The wedding episode aired on July 23, 2006. Some of the notable parts of the second season are Adrianne meeting her father-in-law, Christopher meeting Adrianne's divorced parents, Knight getting drunk in front of Adrianne's mother, Christopher and Adrianne's Bachelor's farewell party, and an incident that almost causes the cancellation of the wedding.

== Season 3 ==
Titled My Fair Brady... Maybe Baby, the third season began on January 20, 2008. In the second episode, after Adrianne gave Chris a birthday present of nude photos of her with a female friend, he came to think Adrianne was a lesbian and left her, asking for a separation. The two were reconciled in the next episode. The season focused on Adrianne's plans to have plastic surgery to make her breasts symmetrical and Christopher's cross-interests decision that he wants to start a family with her. The couple argue about this, and even close friends and family members frankly advise them not to have any kids at present. Adrianne does have the surgery, and it goes well. But in the season finale, the couple go to Hawaii for a second honeymoon and Adrianne decides to throw out her birth control pills in front of Christopher.

== DVD releases ==
The first two seasons have been released on DVD in Australia by Shock Records.

Season	Release dates	Discs
Season	Region 4	Discs
1	10 July 2009	2
2	10 July 2009	2
