= Héctor Sandarti =

Guatemalan actor and television presenter

Héctor Sandarti is a Guatemalan television host and actor who was the host of the Spanish-language version of Deal or No Deal (called Vas o No Vas) on the Telemundo Network in the United States. He held similar duties in 2004–2006 for a Mexican version which aired on Televisa. He also worked in Hospital el paisa with Galilea Montijo. He has also hosted "Vida TV" for the TV network as well as a Mexican version of Big Brother. Plus, he has also worked in "Fantástico Amor" with Galilea Montijo. announcing duties included Atinale al Precio (Mexico's version of The Price Is Right) in 2000 and the comedy show Objetos Perdidos.
