= Vas o No Vas (American game show) =

- Created by: John de Mol Jr.
- Based on: Miljoenenjacht; Deal or No Deal
- Presented by: Héctor Sandarti
- Country of origin: United States
- Original language: Spanish

Production
- Executive producer: Stephanie Fisch
- Running time: 60–90 minutes
- Production company: Endemol Mexico

Original release
- Network: Telemundo
- Release: October 8, 2006 – May 26, 2007

Vas o No Vas (Go or No Go, although referred to in English-language closed captioning as Take It or Leave It) is the American Spanish-language version of Deal or No Deal, which debuted on Telemundo from October 8, 2006, to May 26, 2007, and it was produced by Endemol and NBC (the owners of Telemundo). The program was hosted by Héctor Sandarti, who hosted the Mexican version of the same name for Televisa. The show was taped at Televisa's Santa Fe studios in Mexico City, Mexico, where Endemol Mexico is based, in the same studio where the Mexican edition was taped. Originally airing Saturday nights at 7 PM ET/PT in a 90-minute format, the show moved to Saturday afternoons at 1PM ET/PT, edited to 60 minutes in length.

The show was permanently axed when the 2007 May sweeps period was almost completed.

== Gameplay ==
While "Vas o No Vas" has the same presentation style and look as the American "Deal or No Deal", the gameplay is different from the American English-language version and adopts variants of European and Australian versions of the game with a quiz contest to determine the player who goes on to play for the money.

=== First round ===
The first round of the game involves two sets of ten potential contestants, in which they each answer a question with three possible answers on cell phones provided in a sponsorship deal by T-Mobile. The two contestants that answered correctly the quickest on each side proceed on stage to play the second round.

=== Second round ===
In the second round, Sandarti asks a series of questions. The first contestant to answer two correctly proceeds to the main game. But first, model Silvia Bianchin, dressed in a red dress, walks on stage with a red case marked "Tentación" (Temptation). The "Tentación" case, which contains cash, a Ford automobile in another sponsor placement, or another prize, is offered to the contestant. The contestant may refuse the Tentación offer and continue to the main game or accept the offer and allow the losing contestant to play the main game.

=== Main round ===
The main round is the same as the American English version, with 26 similarly dressed models (different from the English version, called "Las Bomboletz") carrying 26 cases. The number of cases to be opened in each round (To open, Sandarti says to one of "Las Bombolets", "Abre este portofollio.... ¡ahora!") is also the same, starting with six cases in round one, then five in round two, and so on, all the way down to one case in round six and subsequent rounds. The top prize in this version, however, is US $250,000 (as opposed to $1,000,000 (occasionally $2,000,000) in the English primetime version, the top prize for the daily version was $500,000, though there were only 22 amounts and 22 cases in that version). If the player can keep the top prize amount in play after three rounds, they win a Ford automobile which is theirs to keep no matter what happens in the main game.

After each round, as in the English version, the banker ("La Banca") calls the host. However, the offer is announced after the banker's female assistant (played by Zanesta Seilerova) comes on stage with a case containing the offer that the banker offers the contestant. For example, if the banker is offering $3,200, then she will say, "La Banca te ofrece,... tres mil doscientos dolares." In addition, in some offers, the "Tentación" case would also be brought on stage as a further enticement. The "Tentación" is shown before the contestant decides to accept the offer and leave the game ("Voy"), or refuse the offer and continue ("No Voy").

At the conclusion of the first round, a guessing game similar to the Australian version's "Megaguess" called "La Coincidencia" ("The Coincidence") is played, in which the loser of the head-to-head game (if the winner of that game chooses to play the main game) can win a prize (cash or a trip) by guessing what amount is in the case chosen by the contestant.

The highest amount ever won was $180,500 on November 5, 2006, by a contestant named Gabriela Salazar from San Diego, CA, although another contestant would sell the $250,000 case for only $44,300 the following week. The contestant also won a Ford F-150, boosting her total to over $200,000, an all-time record for a Hispanic-language game show telecast in the USA. Her case chosen (number 26) had $100,000 inside.

=== Lucky Case Game ===
The at-home "Lucky Case Game" ("El Portfolio de la Suerte") was the same as the English version, except that the prize is doubled to $15,000.

== Case values for Vas o No Vas ==
$0.01
$0.25
$1
$5
$10
$25
$50
$75
$100
$200
$300
$400
$500

$1,000
$1,250
$2,500
$5,000
$7,500
$10,000
$20,000
$30,000
$40,000
$50,000
$100,000
$125,000
$250,000
