= International versions of Deal or No Deal =

Deal or No Deal is an international game show franchise created by Dick de Rijk and John de Mol Jr. for the Dutch company Endemol. The player picks one of several cases or boxes to keep, each containing a sum of money, then eliminates the others from the game. The Banker then tries to buy the player's case or box for as little money as possible. The player then answers the titular question, "Deal or No Deal?". In other words, they have to decide whether to accept the Banker's offer and end the game or reject it and play on, hoping their case or box contains more than the offer.

The first appearance of the game was on the Dutch game show Miljoenenjacht in 2002. Since then, Deal or No Deal has been adapted by 84 countries and territories.

== International versions ==
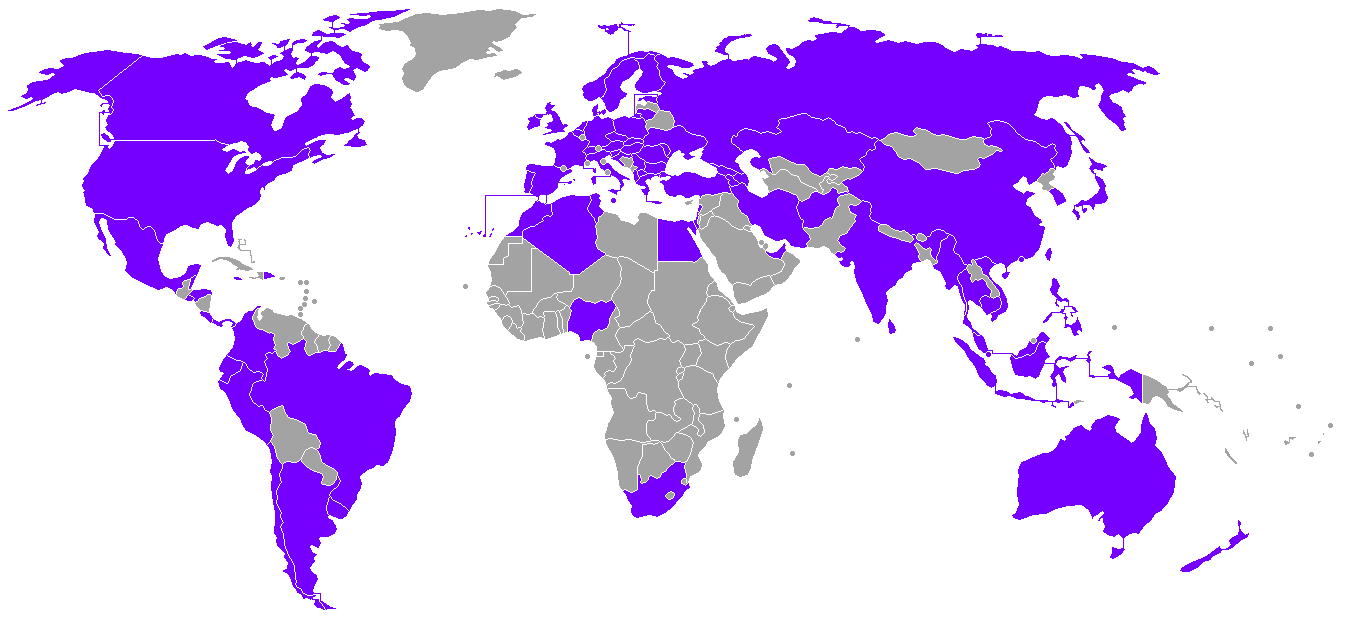
Countries with their own version (as of April 2020)

Miljoenenjacht (the first version of Deal or No Deal) was actually based on a German game show called Die Chance deines Lebens, hosted by Kai Pflaume. Miljoenenjacht started in November 2000 and introduced the case game in December 2002 after a 15-month hiatus of the show.

Howie Mandel, Héctor Sandarti, and Linda de Mol each have hosted multiple versions of the show in different countries at one time: Mandel hosted Deal or No Deal Canada while still hosting the American version, Sandarti hosted the American Spanish version while still hosting the Mexican version, and de Mol hosted Der Millionen-Deal in Germany while still hosting Miljoenenjacht in the Netherlands.

Legend:

Currently airing
Awaiting confirmation
Status unknown
Upcoming season
No longer airing

Country	Name	Hosts	Channel	Premiere date	End date	Top prize	Format	Cases or boxes? (number)
Afghanistan	گنجینه; Ganjina	Rahim Mehrzad	Tolo TV	May 30, 2010	2011	؋1,000,000	Daytime	Boxes (20)
Afghanistan	گنجینه; Ganjina	Rahim Mehrzad	Tolo TV	2012	2012	؋1,000,000	Daytime	Cases (20)
Afghanistan	گنجینه; Ganjina	Mukhtar Lashkari	Tolo TV	2013	May 14, 2013	؋1,000,000	Daytime	Cases (20)
Albania Kosovo	Kutia	Enkel Demi	TV Klan	September 2004	December 2011	€5,000 €10,000 €20,000 €25,000	Daytime	Boxes (26); Cases (22) (2007)
Albania Kosovo	Dilema: Deal or No Deal	Eno Popi	Top Channel	October 14, 2018	2020	L1,000,000; L2,000,000 (Sundays only)	Daytime	Cases (26)
Algeria	أدي ولا خلي; Éddi Ouela Kheli	Sofiane Dani	Echourouk TV	June 17, 2015	2019	د.ج 5,000,000 د.ج 10,000,000	Daytime	Boxes (22)
Arab world	الصفقة; Al Safqa	Amir Karara	MBC1	September 14, 2004	2004	US$1,000,000	Miljoenenjacht	Cases (26)
Arab world	Deal or No Deal	Michel Sanan	LBC	April 1, 2005	2006	US$250,000	Daytime	Boxes (22)
Argentina	Trato Hecho	Julian Weich	Telefe	July 13, 2003	March 2006	AR$250,000	Miljoenenjacht	Cases (26)
Argentina	Trato Hecho	Lizy Tagliani and Roberto Moldavsky	Telefe	May 9, 2021	January 29, 2022	AR$2,000,000	American	Cases (26)
Argentina	Trato Hecho	Santiago Maratea	América TV	August 11, 2025	October 19, 2025	AR$20,000,000	Daytime	Cases (24)
Armenia	Դիլ կամ Նո Դիլ; Dil kam No Dil	Hovhannes Tovmasyan	Armenia TV	November 2006	2008	֏ 100,000,000	American	Cases (26)
Australia	Deal or No Deal	Andrew O'Keefe	Seven Network	July 13, 2003	October 4, 2013	A$2,000,000 (2003); A$200,000 (2004–2013)	Miljoenenjacht (2003); Condensed format based on Miljoenenjacht (2004–2006); Daytime (2007–2013)	Cases (26)
Australia	Deal or No Deal	Grant Denyer	Network 10	January 29, 2024	present	A$100,000	Daytime	Cases (22)
Australia	Deal or No Deal Celebrity Jackpot	Grant Denyer	Network 10	July 22, 2024	December 17, 2024	A$250,000	Daytime	Cases (26)
Australia	Deal or No Deal Celebrity Jackpot	Grant Denyer	Network 10	August 10, 2026	September 14, 2026	A$200,000	Daytime	Cases (26)
Austria	Deal or No Deal – Die Lotto Show	Rainhard Fendrich	ORF 1	2005		€250,000	Miljoenenjacht	Cases (26)
Azerbaijan	Davam Ya Tamam	Idris Cafarov	Space TV	2010	2011	₼10,000	Daytime	Boxes (21)
Azerbaijan	Davam Ya Tamam	Murad Dadaşov	Azad Azerbaijan TV	October 31, 2016	August 6, 2017	₼30,000	Daytime	Cases (24)
Belgium	Miljoenenjacht	Walter Grootaers	VTM	October 16, 2004	2005	€1,000,000	Miljoenenjacht	Cases (26)
Belgium	Te Nemen of Te Laten	Felice	VijfTV	August 21, 2006	2009	€200,000	Daytime	Boxes (22)
Brazil	Topa ou Não Topa	Silvio Santos	SBT	August 6, 2006	April 29, 2007	R$1,000,000	American	Cases (26)
Brazil	Topa ou Não Topa	Roberto Justus	SBT	August 25, 2010	May 26, 2011	R$1,000,000	American	Cases (26)
Brazil	Topa ou Não Topa	Patricia Abravanel	SBT	August 17, 2019	June 28, 2020	R$1,000,000	American	Cases (26)
Bulgaria	Сделка или не Sdelka ili ne	Rumen Lukanov	Nova Television	September 19, 2005	January 7, 2018	лв. 75,000 (2005–2006) лв. 100,000 (2006–2016); 1 kg of gold (2017–2018)	Daytime	Boxes (22); Boxes (24) (2013-2016)
Bulgaria	Сделка или не Sdelka ili ne	Nencho Balabanov	Nova Television	September 4, 2023	June 1, 2026	лв. 100,000 (2023–2025) €50,000 (2026–present)	Daytime	Boxes (24)
Bulgaria	Сделка или не Sdelka ili ne	Pavel Vladimirov	Nova Television	September 14, 2026	present	лв. 100,000 (2023–2025) €50,000 (2026–present)	Daytime	Boxes (24)
Cambodia	ព្រម ឬមិនព្រម; Prom Rer Min Prom	Ith Setha	CTN	2009	2009	៛10,000,000	American	Cases (26)
Canada	Deal or No Deal Canada	Howie Mandel	Global	February 4, 2007	March 1, 2007	CA$1,000,000	American	Cases (26)
Canada	Le Banquier	Julie Snyder	TVA	January 24, 2007	May 21, 2017	CA$500,000	American	Cases (26)
Chile	Trato Hecho	Don Francisco	Canal 13	October 19, 2004	2006	CL$120,000,000	Miljoenenjacht	Cases (26)
Chile	Allá Tú	Julián Elfenbein	Chilevisión	April 16, 2007	December 28, 2007	CL$10,000,000	Daytime	Boxes (22)
Colombia	¡Hay Trato!	Julio Correal; Carlos Calero	Caracol Televisión	July 16, 2005	2006	COL$210,000,000	Miljoenenjacht	Cases (26)
Costa Rica	Trato Hecho	Gustavo Rojas	Teletica	April 10, 2012	2014	₡25,000,000	American	Cases (26)
Croatia	Uzmi ili ostavi	Željko Pervan; Mirko Fodor; Mario Petreković	HRT 2	2005	2009	kn 500,000	Daytime	Boxes (21)
Czech Republic	Ber nebo neber	Pavel Zuna	TV Prima	February 11, 2007	December 27, 2008	5,000,000 Kč	American (with qualifying quiz round)	Cases (26)
Denmark	Deal or No Deal	Casper Christensen	TV 2	August 28, 2006	November 22, 2007	kr. 2,000,000	American	Cases (26)
Dominican Republic	Trato Hecho con Nestlé	Frank Perozo; Mía Taveras	Antena Latina	July 2008	2009	RD$3,000,000	American	Cases (24)
East Africa	Deal or No Deal	Ronnie Mich Egwang	M-Net	2007		US$100,000	American	Cases (26)
Ecuador	¡Trato Hecho!	Roberto Angelelli	Teleamazonas	April 9, 2006	2007	US$100,000	Miljoenenjacht	Cases (?)
Ecuador	El Familión Nestlé Trato Hecho	Daniel Sarcos	Gama TV; Red Telesistema	January 26, 2010	2011	US$100,000	American	Cases (24)
Egypt	لعبة الحياة; Le'bet el Hayah	Razan Maghrebi	Al-Hayat TV	August 24, 2009	2010	E£250,000; E£500,000	Daytime	Boxes (22)
Egypt	ديل أور نو ديل: الإختيار; Deal or no deal: El Ikhtiyar	Maya Diab	Al-Nahar	May 27, 2012	2012	E£250,000	Daytime	Boxes (22)
El Salvador	Trato Hecho	Daniel Rucks	TCS	May 1, 2012	2014	US$50,000	American	Cases (26)
El Salvador	Trato Hecho	Mario Sibrian	TCS	September 6, 2020	September 5, 2021	US$15,000	Daytime	Cases (24)
Estonia	Võta või jäta	Sepo Seeman; Alari Kivisaar	TV3	2007	2010	250,000 krooni 1,000,000 krooni	American	Cases (26)
Estonia	Võta või jäta	Alari Kivisaar	TV3	March 8, 2013	2015	€100,000	American	Cases (26)
Finland	Ota tai jätä	Pauli Aalto-Setälä	Nelonen	January 10, 2007	November 29, 2007	€500,000	American	Cases (26)
France	À prendre ou à laisser	Arthur	TF1	January 12, 2004	June 2, 2006	€500,000 €1,000,000 (specials)	Daytime	Boxes (22)
France	À prendre ou à laisser	Arthur	TF1	September 4, 2006	June 3, 2010	€1,000,000 (2006) €500,000 (2009-2010)	Daytime	Boxes (24)
France	À prendre ou à laisser	Julien Courbet	D8	October 8, 2014	October 30, 2015	€100,000	Daytime	Boxes (24 + 1)
France	À prendre ou à laisser	Cyril Hanouna; Valérie Bénaïm (Note: Fridays from September 4 to October 2, 2020); Bernard Montiel (Note: September 28, 2020); Christophe Dechavanne	C8	May 18, 2020	June 25, 2021	Jackpot (starts from €250,000) (Note: Rises by €5,000 if not won.)	Daytime	Boxes (24 + 1)
Georgia	ვა-ბანკი Va-banki	Misha Mshvildadze (2008); Duta Skhirtladze (2009)	Rustavi 2	November 11, 2008	June 23, 2009	₾50,000	American	Cases (26)
Germany	Der MillionenDeal	Linda de Mol	Sat.1	May 1, 2004	June 12, 2004	€2,000,000	Miljoenenjacht	Cases (26)
Germany	Deal or No Deal – Die Show der Glücksspirale	Guido Cantz	Sat.1	June 23, 2005	December 20, 2008	€250,000	American	Cases (20) (2005); Cases (26) (2006-2008)
Germany	Deal or No Deal	Wayne Carpendale	Sat.1	July 30, 2014	August 5, 2015	€250,000	Daytime	Boxes (20)
Germany	Deal or No Deal	Jörg Pilawa	Sat.1	December 13, 2026 (Note: Celebrity special.); December 14, 2026	TBD	€100,000	Daytime	Cases (22)
Greece Cyprus	Deal	Christos Ferentinos	ANT1	January 23, 2006	2008	€200,000	Daytime	Boxes (22)
Greece Cyprus	Deal	Christos Ferentinos	ANT1	2010	March 4, 2011	€150,000	Daytime	Boxes (22)
Greece Cyprus	Deal	Christos Ferentinos	Alpha TV	October 3, 2016	July 9, 2023	€60,000	Daytime	Boxes (22 + 1)
Greece Cyprus	Deal	Giorgos Thanailakis	Alpha TV	September 23, 2024	present	€70,000	Daytime	Boxes (22 + 1)
Greece Cyprus	Super Deal (weekends)	Christos Ferentinos	ANT1	2006	2008	€500,000	American	Cases (26)
Honduras	Trato Hecho	Erik Chavarría	Televicentro	April 19, 2015	2015	L 1,000,000	American	Cases (26)
Hong Kong	一擲千金; Deal or No Deal	Michael Hui	TVB Jade	October 29, 2006	January 21, 2007	HK$3,000,000	American	Cases (26)
Hong Kong	一擲千金; Deal or No Deal	Alfred Cheung	TVB Jade	April 22, 2007	February 17, 2008	HK$3,000,000	American	Cases (26)
Hungary	Áll az alku	Gábor Gundel Takács	TV2	April 4, 2004	December 16, 2005	50,000,000 Ft	Miljoenenjacht	Cases (21)
Hungary	Áll az alku	Gábor Gundel Takács	TV2	January 2, 2006	September 29, 2006	50,000,000 Ft	Daytime	Cases (21)
Hungary	Áll az alku	Gábor Gundel Takács	TV2	October 2, 2006	December 31, 2006	100,000,000 Ft	Daytime	Cases (21)
Hungary	Áll az alku	Áron Kovács	TV2	May 4, 2009	June 4, 2010	21,000,000 Ft	Daytime	Cases (21)
Hungary	Áll az alku	Gábor Gundel Takács	TV2	August 28, 2017	August 23, 2019	50,000,000 Ft	Daytime	Cases (22 + 1)
India	Deal Ya No Deal	R. Madhavan	Sony Entertainment Television	November 23, 2005	December 2005	₹10,000,000	Daytime	Boxes (22)
India	Deal Ya No Deal	Mandira Bedi	Sony Entertainment Television	January 2006	2006	₹10,000,000	Daytime	Cases (22)
India	Deal Ya No Deal	Rajeev Khandelwal	Sony Entertainment Television	April 2006	July 26, 2006	₹10,000,000	American	Cases (26)
India	Deala No Deala	Rishi	Sun TV	October 31, 2009	March 3, 2012	₹5,000,000	American	Cases (26 + 1)
India	Deal or No Deal	Mukesh	Surya TV	November 7, 2009	March 3, 2012	₹5,000,000	American	Cases (26 + 1)
India	Deal or No Deal	Suraj Venjaramoodu	Surya TV	December 25, 2016	August 20, 2017	₹5,000,000	American	Cases (26)
India	Deal or No Deal	Sai Kumar	Gemini TV	November 7, 2009	March 3, 2012	₹5,000,000	American	Cases (26 + 1)
India	Deal or No Deal	Ronit Roy	&TV	September 5, 2015	November 29, 2015	₹10,000,000	American	Cases (26)
Indonesia	Deal or No Deal Indonesia	Tantowi Yahya	RCTI	May 19, 2007	December 18, 2008	Rp 2,000,000,000	American	Cases (26)
Indonesia	Deal or No Deal	Deddy Corbuzier	antv	December 1, 2011	February 3, 2012	Rp 1,000,000,000	American	Cases (26)
Indonesia	Deal or No Deal Indonesia	Cak Lontong	Global TV	October 20, 2014	January 29, 2015	Rp 500,000,000	Daytime	Cases (20)
Iran	تمام یا دوام; Tamam ya davam	Sina Valiollah	Farsi1	January 16, 2012	April 27, 2012	US$20,000	Daytime	Cases (20)
Ireland	Deal or No Deal	Keith Barry	TV3	November 13, 2009	March 12, 2010	€250,000	Daytime	Boxes (26)
Israel	הדיל הגדול; Hadil Hagadol דיל או לא דיל; Dil o Lo Dil	Moran Atias	Channel 10	March 16, 2005	2006	₪1,500,000	Miljoenenjacht	Cases (26)
Italy	Affari tuoi	Paolo Bonolis (2003–2005); Pupo (2005–2006); Antonella Clerici (2006); Flavio Insinna (2006–2008; 2013–2017); Max Giusti (2008–2013)	Rai 1	October 13, 2003	March 17, 2017	€500,000 €1,000,000 (specials)	Daytime	Boxes (20)
Italy	Affari tuoi – Viva gli sposi!	Carlo Conti	Rai 1	December 26, 2020	February 6, 2021	€300,000	Daytime	Boxes (20)
Italy	Affari tuoi – Formato Famiglia	Amadeus and Giovanna Civitillo	Rai 1	February 19, 2022	March 26, 2022	€300,000	Daytime	Boxes (20)
Italy	Affari tuoi	Amadeus (2023–2024); Stefano De Martino (2024–present)	Rai 1	April 16, 2023	present	€300,000	Daytime	Boxes (20)
Jamaica	Digicel Deal or No Deal	Simon Crosskill	TVJ	September 23, 2009	2009	J$1,000,000	American	Cases (26)
Japan	ザ・ディール; Za Dīru	Shinsuke Shimada	TBS	September 8, 2006	April 5, 2007	¥10,000,000	American	Cases (26)
Kazakhstan	Удачная Сделка; Udachnaya sdelka	Shah-Kerim Karmenov	Khabar	April 3, 2020	November 20, 2020	₸3,000,000	Daytime	Boxes (22)
Kazakhstan	Қолда я Жолда; Qolda ia jolda	Shah-Kerim Karmenov	Khabar	March 1, 2021	July 2, 2021	₸3,000,000	Daytime	Boxes (22)
Lebanon	Deal or No Deal	Michel Sanan	Murr Television	October 20, 2009	June 7, 2010	ل.ل 200,000,000	American	Cases (26)
Lithuania	Taip arba Ne	Marijonas Mikutavičius; Sigutis Jačėnas	TV3 Lithuania	March 31, 2007	2009	500,000 Lt	Daytime	Cases (22)
Lithuania	Taip arba Ne	Vytautas Šapranauskas	TV3 Lithuania	January 2010	2010	200,000 Lt	Daytime	Boxes (20) (January-March 2010); Cases (20) (March 2010 onwards)
Malaysia	Deal or No Deal Malaysia	Aanont Wathanasin	ntv7	November 3, 2007	2009	RM100,000	American (with qualifying quiz round)	Cases (26)
Malaysia	一擲千金; Yi zhi qian jin	Goh Wee Ping; Owen Yap	ntv7	March 12, 2007	2008	RM100,000	American (with qualifying quiz round)	Cases (26)
Malta	Deal or No Deal Malta	Pablo Micallef	TVM	October 1, 2007	2010	€25,000	Daytime	Boxes (22)
Mexico	Vas o No Vas con Boletazo	Héctor Sandarti	Televisa	2005	2007	Mex$1,000,000 (daily); Mex$5,000,000 (Saturdays)	Daytime (daily); Miljoenenjacht with models holding cases (26) (Saturdays)	Boxes (22) (daily); Cases (26) (Saturdays)
Mexico	Yoo si vooy	Raul Araiza	Televisa	September 2009	2010	Mex$2,500,000	American	Cases (26)
Mexico	¿Te la juegas?	Luis García	TV Azteca	August 12, 2019	November 27, 2020	Mex$1,000,000	Daytime	Boxes (22) (with three boxes holding the top prize)
Moldova	Da sau Nu	Dan Negru	Prime	2010	2019	L 250,000	American	Cases (26)
Myanmar	Deal or No Deal Myanmar	Kaung Htet Zaw	MRTV-4	January 5, 2015	2015	K 2,000,000	Daytime	Boxes (22)
Netherlands	Postcode Loterij Miljoenenjacht (original version)	Linda de Mol	TROS, Tien, RTL4, SBS6	November 25, 2000	present	€5,000,000	Die Chance deines Lebens (2000–2002); Miljoenenjacht (2002–2010); Modified version of Miljoenenjacht with models holding the cases (2010–present)	N/A (2000–2002); Cases (26) (2002–present)
Netherlands	Postcode Loterij Deal or No Deal	Beau van Erven Dorens	Tien, RTL5	August 27, 2006	May 15, 2009	€250,000	Daytime	Boxes (20)
Netherlands	Postcode Loterij Deal or No Deal	Buddy Vedder	RTL4, (Note: VIP Special) RTL5	October 3, 2021; October 4, 2021	February 2022	€200,000	Daytime	Boxes (24)
New Zealand	Deal or No Deal	Jeremy Corbett	TV3	June 6, 2007	December 26, 2007	NZ$200,000	American	Cases (26)
Nigeria	Deal or No Deal Nigeria	John Fashanu	M-Net Africa	July 7, 2007	December 29, 2007	US$100,000	American	Cases (26)
North Macedonia	Земи или остави Zemi ili ostavi	Igor Dzambazov	Alfa TV	2009	2009	ден 6,000,000	Daytime	Boxes (?)
North Macedonia	Сѐ или нешто Sè ili nešto	Lila Stojanovska	Sitel	December 18, 2011	present	ден 1,000,000	Daytime	Boxes (26) (2011-2013); Boxes (22 + 1) (2013-present)
Norway	Deal or No Deal	Sturla Berg-Johansen	TV2	September 30, 2006	2008	kr 3,000,000	American	Cases (26)
Panama	El Familión Nestlé	Nelson Bustamante	Telemetro	2006	2007	US$125,000	Condensed version of Miljoenenjacht	Cases (24)
Panama	Deal or No Deal	Nelson Bustamante	Telemetro	March 29, 2010	2012	US$50,000	American	Cases (26)
Peru	Trato Hecho	Adolfo Aguilar	ATV	August 8, 2005	December 9, 2005	S/.250,000	?	Cases (?)
Peru	Vas o No Vas	Jesús Alzamora	Panamericana	September 12, 2016	December 21, 2016	S/.20,000	Daytime	Boxes (20)
Philippines	Kapamilya, Deal or No Deal	Kris Aquino	ABS-CBN	June 5, 2006	February 23, 2007	₱2,000,000 ₱4,000,000 (specials)	American	Cases (26)
Philippines	Kapamilya, Deal or No Deal	Kris Aquino	ABS-CBN	June 11, 2007	January 11, 2008	₱3,000,000	American	Cases (26)
Philippines	Kapamilya, Deal or No Deal	Kris Aquino	ABS-CBN	July 28, 2008	March 27, 2009	₱2,000,000 ₱4,000,000 (specials) ₱1,000,000 (Christmas specials, with three cases holding the top prize)	American	Cases (26)
Philippines	Kapamilya, Deal or No Deal	Luis Manzano	ABS-CBN	February 25, 2012	September 28, 2013	₱2,000,000	American	Cases (24)
Philippines	Kapamilya, Deal or No Deal	Luis Manzano	ABS-CBN	February 9, 2015	March 4, 2016	₱1,000,000	Daytime	Cases (20)
Philippines	Kapamilya, Deal or No Deal	Luis Manzano	Kapamilya Channel, A2Z, ALLTV, TV5	April 25, 2026	present	₱1,000,000	Daytime	Cases (20)
Poland	Grasz czy nie grasz	Zygmunt Chajzer	Polsat	October 1, 2005	June 2006	1,000,000zł	Miljoenenjacht	Cases (26)
Poland	Grasz czy nie grasz	Zygmunt Chajzer	Polsat	September 7, 2006	June 16, 2007	1,000,000zł	American	Cases (26)
Portugal	Pegar ou Largar	Rui Unas	SIC	January 28, 2006	April 22, 2006	€300,000	Miljoenenjacht (with models holding the cases)	Cases (26)
Romania	Da sau nu	Virgil Ianţu; Mihai Dobrovolschi	Prima TV	September 5, 2005	2006	RON 150,000	Miljoenenjacht	Cases (26)
Romania	Accepți sau nu	Gabriel Coveşanu	Kanal D	March 1, 2008	2009	RON 100,000	American	Cases (26)
Romania	Batem palma?	Cosmin Seleși	Pro TV	December 12, 2022	present	RON 100,000	Daytime	Boxes (24)
Russia	Пан или пропал Pan ili propal	Nikolai Fomenko	Channel One	September 20, 2004	January 5, 2005	3,000,000 ₽	Daytime	Cases (22)
Russia	Сделка?! Sdelka?!	Aleksei Veselkin	REN TV	April 17, 2006	September 22, 2006	3,000,000 ₽	Daytime	Cases (22)
Serbia	Uzmi ili ostavi	Milorad Mandić Manda	B92	May 7, 2007	June 12, 2008	din. 1,500,000	Daytime	Boxes (22)
Singapore	Deal or No Deal	Adrian Pang	MediaCorp TV Channel 5	May 13, 2007	January 31, 2008	S$250,000	American	Cases (26)
Slovakia	Ruku na to	Peter Šarkan Novák	STV	September 2005	November 7, 2006	5,000,000 Sk	Miljoenenjacht	Cases (26)
Slovakia	Veľký balík	Marcel Forgáč	JOJ	January 5, 2018	December 29, 2018	€250,000	Daytime	Boxes (26)
Slovenia	Vzemi ali pusti	Bojan Emeršič	POP TV	2005	2008	15,000,000 tolarjev €70,000	Daytime	Boxes (24)
South Africa	Deal or No Deal	Ed Jordan	M-Net	February 4, 2007	2008	R 1,000,000	American	Cases (26)
South Africa	Doen met 'n Miljoen!	Casper de Vries	kykNET	October 19, 2007	January 9, 2009	R 1,000,000	?	Cases (?)
South Africa	Deal or No Deal	Katlego Maboe	SABC 1 (2023–2024); SABC 2 (2024–present)	March 6, 2023	present	R 250,000	Daytime	Boxes (20)
South Africa	Deal or No Deal Celebrity	Katlego Maboe	SABC 1	March 9, 2024	present	R 250,000	American	Cases (20)
South Korea	Yes or No	Shin Dong-Yeob	tvN	2006	July 2007	₩100,000,000	American	Cases (26)
Spain	¡Allá tú!	Jesús Vázquez; Silvia Jato; Arturo Valls	Telecinco	January 26, 2004	2008	€300,000 €600,000 €1,000,000 (2006 special)	Daytime; American (2006 special)	Boxes (22); Cases (26) (2006 special)
Spain	¡Allá tú!	Jesús Vázquez	Cuatro	January 10, 2011	November 4, 2011	€300,000	Daytime	Boxes (22)
Spain	¡Allá tú!	Jesús Vázquez	Telecinco	July 9, 2023	September 10, 2023	€250,000	Daytime	Boxes (22)
Spain	¡Allá tú!	Jesús Vázquez	Telecinco	December 25, 2023	April 1, 2024	€150,000	Daytime	Boxes (22)
Spain	¡Allá tú!	Jesús Vázquez	Telecinco	July 27, 2025	August 31, 2025	€250,000	Daytime	Boxes (22)
Spain	¡Allá tú!	Juanra Bonet	Telecinco	January 12, 2026	present	€100,000 €150,000	Daytime	Boxes (22)
Sri Lanka	Gando Nogando	Mahendra Perera	Sirasa TV	December 12, 2008	March 6, 2009	රු.2,500,000	Daytime	Boxes (?)
Sweden	Deal or No Deal	Martin Timell	TV4	March 25, 2006	December 1, 2007	kr 5,000,000	Miljoenenjacht	Cases (24)
Sweden	MiljonJakten	Renée Nyberg	TV3	March 4, 2012	January 3, 2014	kr 10,000,000	Miljoenenjacht	Cases (26)
Sweden	Deal or No Deal med Miljonjakten	Renée Nyberg	TV4	November 18, 2014	December 22, 2014	kr 10,000,000	Miljoenenjacht	Cases (26)
Sweden	Postkodlotteriets Deal or No Deal	Rickard Sjöberg	TV4	May 9, 2025	June 6, 2026	kr 1,000,000	Daytime	Cases (20)
Sweden	Miljonjakten med Deal or No Deal	Rickard Sjöberg	TV4	December 26, 2026	present	kr 10,000,000	Modified version of Miljoenenjacht (with models holding the cases)	Cases (26)
Switzerland	Deal or No Deal – Das Risiko	Roman Kilchsperger	SRF 1	September 1, 2004	September 29, 2010	CHF 250,000	Modified version of Miljoenenjacht (with models holding the cases)	Cases (26)
Thailand	เอาหรือไม่เอา	Dom Hetrakul	ThaiTV 3	January 3, 2005	September 26, 2005	฿1,000,000	Miljoenenjacht (with models holding the cases)	Cases (26)
Tunisia	دليلك ملك; Dlilek Mlek	Sami El Fihri	Tunisie 7	2005	2007	د.ت 300,000 د.ت 500,000 د.ت 1,000,000	Daytime	Boxes (24)
Tunisia	دليلك ملك; Dlilek Mlek	Sami El Fihri	El Hiwar Et Tounsi	June 29, 2014	June 2018	د.ت 1,000,000 د.ت 2,000,000 (Ramadan 2017)	Daytime	Boxes (24)
Turkey	Trilyon Avı	Zafer Ergin	ATV	December 9, 2003	February 3, 2004	₺1,000,000	Miljoenenjacht	Cases (26)
Turkey	Büyük Teklif	Halit Ergenç	Kanal D	June 5, 2006	2006	₺500,000	American	Cases (26)
Turkey	Var mısın? Yok musun?	Acun Ilıcalı	Show TV	September 10, 2007	September 16, 2010	₺500,000	Daytime; American (2007 special)	Boxes (24, with 3-5 containing the top prize from 2008); Cases (26) (2007 special)
Turkey	Var mısın? Yok musun?	Asuman Krause	Fox	November 8, 2011	March 29, 2012	₺500,000	Daytime	Boxes (22)
Turkey	Var mısın? Yok musun?	Ahmet Çakar	Show TV	September 11, 2013	October 2013	₺500,000	Daytime	Boxes (22)
Turkey	Var mısın? Yok musun?	Esra Erol	ATV	May 28, 2026	present	₺5,000,000	Daytime	Boxes (22)
Turkey	İlker Ayrık'la Var mısınız? Yok musunuz?	İlker Ayrık	Star TV	June 25, 2016	November 5, 2016	₺500,000	Daytime (with minigames that increase the number of top-prize amounts)	Boxes (24) (episodes 1-13); Boxes (22) (episodes 14-35)
Ukraine	Граєш чи не граєш? Hrayesh chy ne hrayesh?	Dmitriy Shepelev	TRK Ukrayina	March 7, 2010	December 19, 2010	₴1,000,000	American	Cases (26)
United Kingdom	Deal or No Deal	Noel Edmonds	Channel 4	October 31, 2005	December 23, 2016	£250,000	Daytime	Boxes (22) (2005-13); Boxes (22 + 1) (2014-16)
United Kingdom	Deal or No Deal	Stephen Mulhern	ITV	November 20, 2023	present	£100,000	Daytime	Boxes (22) (2023–present)
United States	Deal or No Deal	Howie Mandel	NBC	December 19, 2005	May 18, 2009	US$1,000,000	American	Cases (26)
United States	Deal or No Deal	Howie Mandel	Syndication	September 8, 2008	May 28, 2010	US$500,000	Daytime	Cases (22)
United States	Deal or No Deal	Howie Mandel	CNBC	December 5, 2018	August 7, 2019	US$1,000,000	American	Cases (26)
United States	Deal or No Deal Island	Joe Manganiello	NBC	February 26, 2024	May 13, 2024	US$13,857,000 (Note: This is the total amount the players added to the Final Case, which the surviving player would play for in the season finale.)	Island	Cases (how many depended on the episode)
United States	Deal or No Deal Island	Joe Manganiello	NBC	January 7, 2025	March 25, 2025	US$12,232,001	Island	Cases (12) (regular episodes); Cases (26) (season finale)
United States	Vas o No Vas	Héctor Sandarti	Telemundo	October 8, 2006	May 26, 2007	US$250,000	American	Cases (26)
United States	Lo Tomas o Lo Dejas	Paul Stanley	UniMás	March 31, 2025	present	US$100,000	Daytime	Cases (24)
Uruguay	Trato Hecho	Sebastián Abreu; Maximiliano de la Cruz	Teledoce	October 28, 2019	February 17, 2021	$U 1,000,000	American	Cases (26)
Uruguay	Trato Hecho Famosos	Maximiliano de la Cruz	Teledoce	January 14, 2020	August 12, 2020	$U 1,000,000	American	Cases (26)
Uruguay	Trato Hecho: Edición Familias	Lucía Rodríguez and Germán Medina	Teledoce	September 8, 2021	April 27, 2022	$U 1,000,000	American	Cases (26)
Uruguay	Trato Hecho: Edición Parejas	Lucía Rodríguez and Germán Medina	Teledoce	August 3, 2022	April 2, 2024	$U 1,000,000	American	Cases (26)
Vietnam	Đi tìm ẩn số (part of TFS's Tạp chí Văn nghệ, initially for Southern Vietnamese viewers only)	Thanh Bạch	HTV7	June 19, 2005	October 8, 2017	₫50,000,000 (2005–2006) ₫100,000,000 (2006–2017)	Condensed version of Miljoenenjacht (2005–2006); Condensed version of Miljoenenjacht with models holding the cases (2006–2017)	Cases (20) (2005–2006); Cases (26) (2006–2017)
Vietnam	Những ẩn số vàng (for Northern Vietnamese viewers only)	Chí Trung	H1	September 10, 2006	September 7, 2008	₫50,000,000	Condensed version of Miljoenenjacht with models holding the cases	Cases (20)

=== Unofficial versions ===
Country	Name	Hosts	Channel	Premiere date	End date	Top prize	Format
Albania	Kutia 21	Enkel Demi	ABC	November 1, 2021	June 17, 2022	€10,000	Boxes
Arab Maghreb	الصندوق; Al Sandouk	Moez Toumi	Nessma TV	November 14, 2012	2013	د.ت 500,000; د.ج 25,000,000; 2,500,000DH	Boxes
Brazil	Eu Compro O Seu Televisor	Silvio Santos	SBT	2004	2004	R$1,000,000	Questions/Televisions
Belize	Tek It or Leave It	Angela Gegg	Channel 5	December 2, 2008	February 17, 2009	BZ$5,000	Boxes
China	动感秀场; Dong Gan Xiu Chang	Cheng Qian	BTV-8	2007	2007	1,000,000 points	Cases
China	爱唱才会赢; Ai Chang Cai Hui Ying	Chen Huan; Tian Yue; Zuo Yan; Huang Ziwen	ZJSTV	November 15, 2008	October 31, 2010	CN¥ 100,000	Cases (2008–2009); Questions/Cases (2009–2010)
Guyana	Digicel Deal or No Deal	Surida Nagreadi; Akelo Elliott	NCN	2023	2023	GY$2,000,000	Cases
Kurdistan	Kilawen	Goran Omer	Kurdsat	August 2008	October 2008	at least US$3,000; US$2,500	Traditional Kurdish Hats
Pakistan	Star Player	Fahim Khan	BOL Entertainment	January 1, 2020	May 31, 2020	₨10,000,000	Cases
Taiwan	齊天大勝 (孤注一擲); Who's the Winner (Topic: The Deal)	Jacky Wu	TTV	July 9, 2005	September 29, 2007	NT$1,000,000; NT$1,500,000	Cases
Taiwan	平民大富翁; Yes or No	Dennis Nieh; Jacky Wu	CTS	September 12, 2009	December 12, 2009	NT$500,000	Cases
Venezuela	La Gran Boloña	Guillermo González	Venevisión	2005	2006	Bs. 100,000,000	Letters

== See also ==
- List of television game show franchises
