= Deal or No Deal Vietnam =

Vietnamese television series

- Đi tìm ẩn số
- Genre: Game show
- Created by: Endemol; Kiet Tuong; TFS
- Directed by: Lê Cường
- Presented by: Thanh Bạch
- Starring: The Banker; 20K (Players, 2005–2006); 26K (Models, 2006–2017)
- Theme music composer: Martijn Schimmer
- Opening theme: "Deal or No Deal"
- Country of origin: Vietnam
- Original language: Vietnamese

Production
- Executive producer: Lý Quang Trung
- Editors: Nguyễn Quốc Hưng; Huỳnh Kim Trúc
- Camera setup: Multiple-camera setup
- Running time: 45–60 minutes
- Production companies: Ho Chi Minh City Television; Endemol

Original release
- Network: HTV7
- Release: June 19, 2005 – September 24, 2017

Đi tìm ẩn số (lit. 'Find the Unknowns') is the first Vietnamese version and also as the Southern Vietnamese version of Deal or No Deal, as a part of TFS's Tạp Chí Văn Nghệ. It premiered on June 19, 2005 on HTV7, hosted by Thanh Bạch.

The top prize was won by Vietnamese actor Lê Bình in October 2011. On July 15, 2012, non-celebrity contestant Minh Trang won the top prize as well.

The show took a break on June 15, 2008, due to the death of Prime Minister Võ Văn Kiệt, later on, May 17, 2009; June 24, 2012; June 30, 2013; August 3, 2014, and August 16, 2015, due to the extended time for the Road to Mount Olympia finals for which one finalist resided in the show's host city, TPHCM, finally later on September 11, 2011; October 13, 2013, and December 4, 2016, due to death of Võ Chí Công, Võ Nguyên Giáp and Fidel Castro respectively.

The final episode was aired on September 24, 2017, with one repeat on the following week. So far Đi tìm Ẩn Số was one of HTV's longest-running game shows, having been on the air for 12 years.

== Gameplay ==
=== Old format (2005–2006) ===
The Vietnamese version was originally similar to the Australian version with 20 cases and the top prize of 50,000,000 Vietnamese đồng (US$2,400). The sounds and musical scoring were adapted from the Dutch version. However, the Preliminary rounds have a shorter and different format compared to the Australian version due to lower players.

==== Before preliminary rounds ====
Before preliminary rounds, the show recruits 20 contestants to correspond with 20 suitcases (19 registered contestants and a lucky audience who is selected at random).

==== Preliminary rounds ====
In the first round, the host asks the contestants 10 questions, each with 4 possible answers, which are given to 20 players. All players are given 5 seconds to answer each question using keypads. If a player answers correctly, they receive one point for each contestant who answered incorrectly (1–19 points). All players who choose a wrong answer receive nothing. The two highest scorers at the end of the round move on to the next round.

In the second round, the two remaining contestants face each other at a single showdown-style podium with two buzzers on it. They are given 5 seconds to decide whether or not to press the button. If a player buzzes, that player receives 2,000,000₫ (for the highest score player) or 1,500,000₫ (for the second highest score player), and the other one moves on to the final round. If no contestant rings the bell, the host will give a simple math question using the order of operations (addition, subtraction, multiplication, and division). The one who buzzes first and calculates correctly proceeds to the final round. However, if that person calculates incorrectly, the other player proceeds to the final round.

==== Main game (Deal or No Deal round) ====
The contestant begins the game by opening five cases. This process is repeated for the next four cases. After the first five cases, the major contestant is given a "Bank Offer", which is a certain amount of money. The contestant now has to decide between a "Deal" or "No Deal". If the contestant says Deal, they win the money that is offered, and they must open the rest of the cases. If the contestant says No Deal, then gameplay continues. The list below explains how many cases must be opened for each round:

- Round 1: 5 cases to open
- Round 2: 4 cases to open
- Round 3: 3 cases to open
- Round 4: 2 cases to open
- Round 5–9: 1 case to open (Depending on when/if a deal is taken)

After round 4, to open the case, the podium player holding the case must first guess the amount that they have in their briefcase, winning a small money if their guess is proved correct upon opening the briefcase. The list below explains how much money must be won for each round:

- Round 5: 600,000₫
- Round 6: 500,000₫
- Round 7: 400,000₫

The Bank Offers are based on, but not equivalent to, the remaining briefcases. That is, if there are mainly large valued briefcases remaining, then there is a high chance that the contestant's briefcase is valuable, and so the Bank Offer will be generous. Conversely, if the player has been less fortunate and opened the more valuable briefcases, then the Bank Offer will be low.

If the player continues to the end without making a "Deal", the game ends with their briefcase being opened and the amount in that briefcase being won, otherwise, they win the offer they said "Deal" to.

=== New format (2006–2017) ===
Starting from 2006, the format followed the US version, with 26 cases held by models. The prizes range from 1,000 đồng (5¢ US) to 100,000,000 đồng (US$4,800). In 2006 and 2007, the sounds and musical scoring were still adapted from the Dutch version. Starting from September 2007, the staff changed to the sounds and musical scoring from the US version, but later added back several sounds and musical scoring from the Dutch version until 2017. However, the show still uses the Dutch version style logo despite being changed to the US format, although the US version style logo appeared on the gameboard screen.

Just like the old gameplay, the preliminary rounds are still used with several changes (except for celebrity editions).

==== Before preliminary rounds ====
Before preliminary rounds, the show recruits 26 contestants to correspond with 26 suitcases (21 registered and 5 lucky audiences selected randomly). However, in several special episodes, excluding celebrity editions, without playing preliminary rounds, the show recruits all 26 registered contestants, sometimes all of those were member of the same organization (usually schools or dancing clubs). In all cases, the host advises the audience to check their seating position in case the computer matches their location.

==== Preliminary rounds ====
In the first round, the host asks the contestants 5 questions, each with 4 possible answers, which are given to 26 players. All players are given 5 seconds to answer each question using keypads. If a player answers correctly, they receive one point for each contestant who answered incorrectly (1–25 points). All players who choose a wrong answer receive nothing. The two highest scorers at the end of the round move on to the next round. However, the preliminary rounds are not played in celebrity editions.

Once again, in the second round, the two remaining contestants face each other at a single showdown-style podium with two buzzers on it. They are given 5 seconds to decide whether or not to press the button. If a player buzzes, that player receives 3,000,000₫ (US$144), and the other one moves on to the final round. Once again, if no one buzzes, the host will give a simple math question using the order of operations (addition, subtraction, multiplication, and division). The one who buzzes first and calculates correctly proceeds to the final round. However, if that person calculates incorrectly, the other player proceeds to the final round. Starting on July 17, 2016, this round only offered math problems to determine which candidate advanced to the final round without fixed prizes.

==== Main game (Deal or No Deal round) ====
Before the game begins, the contestant is asked if they wanted to keep the case as they are allocated or switch to a different one. The contestant begins the game by opening the sixth case. This process is repeated for the next five cases. After the first five cases, the major contestant is given a "Bank Offer", which is a certain amount of money. The contestant now has to decide between a "Deal" or "No Deal". If the contestant says Deal, they win the money that is offered, and they must open the rest of the cases. If the contestant says No Deal, then gameplay continues. The list below explains how many cases must be opened for each round:

- Round 1: 6 cases to open
- Round 2: 5 cases to open
- Round 3: 4 cases to open
- Round 4: 3 cases to open
- Round 5: 2 cases to open
- Round 6–10: 1 case to open (Depending on when/if a deal is taken)

After round 4, to open the case, the podium player or the audience must first guess the amount that they have in their briefcase, winning a small money if their guess is proved correct upon opening the briefcase. The list below explains how much money must be won for each round:

- Round 5: 1,200,000₫
- Round 6: 1,000,000₫
- Round 7: 800,000₫
- Round 8: 600,000₫
- Round 9: 400,000₫
- Round 10–11: 500,000₫

Just like the old gameplay, the Bank Offers are based on, but not equivalent to, the remaining briefcases. That is, if there are mainly large valued briefcases remaining, then there is a high chance that the contestant's briefcase is valuable, and so the Bank Offer will be generous. Conversely, if the player has been less fortunate and opened the more valuable briefcases, then the Bank Offer will be low. This is followed by a "phone call" from "The Banker", a mysterious figure whose face is not shown. He purportedly sits in a secret place that can't be seen inside the studio, but unlike other versions, his room can be seen inside, albeit the light was darken to hidden his face (from 2007 to 2009 he was a representative of Gia Định Bank (now Bản Việt Bank), which was the bank sponsor of the show) and makes an offer, via telephone to the host (his voice is never heard) to buy the contestant's case, loosely based on the mean of the cash amounts still in play, and also based on the player's psychology. The player is then asked by Thanh Bạch the title question: "Chấp nhận hay không chấp nhận?" (Deal or No Deal?)

If the player continues to the end without making a "Deal", the game ends with their briefcase being opened and the amount in that briefcase being won, otherwise, they win the offer they said "Deal" to.

==== Celebrity Edition ====
Most celebrity episodes of the show removed the preliminary rounds, making the format exactly similar to the US format. Instead, 2 celebrities advanced to the final round instead of 1.

== Case values ==
There are many versions of game board, since the show has evolved. Here are all the versions:

=== 20 cases format (2005–2006) ===
The currency of the amounts on the money board, on the briefcases, and offered by the Banker to the contestants is in Vietnamese đồng (₫). The smallest case of the first format is 1₫ ($0,0000632), the lowest known value worldwide. The first nine cases were label from 01 to 09 instead of 1 to 9.

1 ₫	500.000 ₫
50 ₫	1.000.000 ₫
100 ₫	1.500.000 ₫
500 ₫	2.000.000 ₫
1.000 ₫	2.500.000 ₫
5.000 ₫	5.000.000 ₫
10.000 ₫	7.500.000 ₫
25.000 ₫	10.000.000 ₫
50.000 ₫	25.000.000 ₫
100.000 ₫	50.000.000 ₫

=== 26 cases format (2006–2017) ===
After a change to the American format, the number of cases was increased to 26, the lowest case was increased to 1,000₫, and the top prize was doubled to 100,000,000₫. However, for an unknown reason, the ₫ sign is never used in all of the amounts on the money board, but it was still used on the briefcases and offers by the Banker to the contestants.

1,000 ₫	1,000,000 ₫
2,500 ₫	1,250,000 ₫
5,000 ₫	1,500,000 ₫
7,500 ₫	2,000,000 ₫
10,000 ₫	3,000,000 ₫
15,000 ₫	4,000,000 ₫
20,000 ₫	5,000,000 ₫
25,000 ₫	10,000,000 ₫
50,000 ₫	15,000,000 ₫
75,000 ₫	20,000,000 ₫
100,000 ₫	25,000,000 ₫
250,000 ₫	50,000,000 ₫
500,000 ₫	100,000,000 ₫

== Winners ==
There are 10 grand prize winners in the show's history, but some of them are missing.

No.	Air date	Name contestant	Amount won	Previous offer	Other amount	Notes
1	February 14, 2010	Thanh Xuân	100,000,000Đ ($4,808)	?	?	First known female winner. She appeared on a 2012 special episode as the friend of contestant Hồng Hạnh. Her winner was mentioned in this episode.
2	October 2011	Lê Bình (celebrity)	100,000,000Đ ($4,808)	75,411,000₫	50,000,000₫	First known celebrity winner. His last 2 cases were the highest 2 in the game.
3	15 July 2012	Nguyễn Thụy Minh Trang	100,000,000Đ ($4,801)	40,010,000₫	25,000₫	
4	28 February 2016	Nguyễn Thị Đào	100,000,000Đ ($4,459)	26,100,000₫	20,000,000₫	
5	3 September 2017	Giáng Tiên (celebrity)	100,000,000Đ ($4,400)	18,340,000₫	75,000₫	Last top prize winner before the series concluded in 2017. Second celebrity winner.

== Những ẩn số vàng ==
Những ẩn số vàng
- Genre: Game show
- Created by: Endemol; Kiet Tuong
- Presented by: Chí Trung
- Starring: The Banker; 20K (Models)
- Theme music composer: Martijn Schimmer
- Opening theme: "Deal or No Deal"
- Country of origin: Vietnam
- Original language: Vietnamese

Production
- Camera setup: Multiple-camera setup
- Running time: 45–60 minutes
- Production companies: Hanoi Television; Endemol

Original release
- Network: Hanoi 1
- Release: September 10, 2006 – September 7, 2008

The second version and also as the Northern Vietnamese version of Deal or No Deal, called Những ẩn số vàng (Hidden Golds) hosted by Chí Trung, was simultaneously aired on H1 from September 10, 2006 to 2008 after the success of the Southern Vietnamese version. The gameplay was the same as the first version. The differences were the prize of round 2 was only 1,500,000₫ (US$72), as well as the final round, which features 20 cases held by models and the prizes range from 1,000₫ to 50,000,000₫. Unlike Đi tìm Ẩn số, the show use the US version style logo, no one become the top prize winner of this version, and the show was ended early in 2008 due to low rating. The sounds and musical scoring were adapted from the Dutch version.

=== Case values ===
1,000 ₫	1,000,000 ₫
2,500 ₫	2,000,000 ₫
5,000 ₫	3,000,000 ₫
10,000 ₫	4,000,000 ₫
25,000 ₫	5,000,000 ₫
50,000 ₫	10,000,000 ₫
75,000 ₫	15,000,000 ₫
100,000 ₫	20,000,000 ₫
250,000 ₫	25,000,000 ₫
500,000 ₫	50,000,000 ₫
