= Deal or No Deal (German game show) =

German television series

Deal or No Deal is the German version of the international game show of Dutch origin of the same name. It was broadcast in Germany by broadcaster Sat.1. The show was premiered on May 1, 2004 as Der Millionen-Deal It was hosted by Linda de Mol, who also is the host of the Dutch show Miljoenenjacht. The game had a top prize of €2,000,000. The first series was a seven-episode run.

== Prizes ==
€0.01	€7,500
€0.20	€10,000
€0.50	€25,000
€1	€50,000
€5	€75,000
€10	€100,000
€20	€200,000
€50	€300,000
€100	€400,000
€500	€500,000
€1,000	€1,000,000
€2,500	€1,500,000
€5,000	€2,000,000

For its second season, which was premiered on June 23, 2005, the show was renamed to Deal or No Deal – Die Show der Glücksspirale and Guido Cantz took over as host with a €250,000 top prize.

€0.01	€1,000
€0.50	€2,500
€1	€5,000
€5	€7,500
€10	€10,000
€25	€25,000
€50	€50,000
€100	€75,000
€250	€100,000
€500	€250,000

The third season - which was premiered on June 28, 2006 - revamped its graphics, models, and featured a set that is identical to the U.S. version.

€0.01	€1,000
€0.20	€2,500
€0.50	€5,000
€1	€7,500
€5	€10,000
€10	€12,500
€20	€15,000
€50	€20,000
€100	€25,000
€200	€50,000
€300	€100,000
€400	€150,000
€500	€250,000

The third season ended on May 19, 2007. The fourth and final season started on July 7, 2007. In October 2008, it was announced that the show would be canceled due to low ratings of 2.2 million viewers per episode.

2014 comes a remake with host Wayne Carpendale but still on Sat.1. The show used British rules and settings of game but the American version's background music.

€1	€1,000
€2	€2,500
€5	€5,000
€10	€10,000
€20	€20,000
€50	€25,000
€100	€50,000
€250	€100,000
€500	€150,000
€750	€250,000
