= Pegar ou Largar =

- Presented by: Rui Unas
- Country of origin: Portugal
- No. of episodes: 13

Production
- Camera setup: Multiple-camera setup
- Running time: 50 minutes (with commercials)

Original release
- Network: SIC
- Release: January 28 – April 22, 2006

Pegar ou Largar ("to catch or to release" in Portuguese) is the Portuguese version of Deal or No Deal. It is produced by SIC and hosted by Rui Unas. It premiered on January 28, 2006.

The set and format is similar to Miljoenenjacht (with 150 contestants compete in each episode), but the 26 cases are held by models, like the American version. The case values range from €0.01 to €300,000.

== Case values ==
€0.01	€1,000
€0.20	€1,500
€0.50	€2,000
€1	€3,000
€5	€4,000
€10	€5,000
€20	€7,500
€50	€10,000
€100	€20,000
€200	€30,000
€300	€50,000
€400	€100,000
€500	€300,000
