= Trilyon Avı =

Turkish game show

Trilyon Avı is the Turkish version of the game show Deal or No Deal. Premiered on December 9, 2003, the show was shown on aTV. It was hosted by Zafer Ergin, a drama player and voice actor. Contestants can win from 100,000 TL (about US$0.07, £0.04, or €0.06) to 1 trillion TL (about US$698,000, £401,000, or €569,000). In the Turkish version, two hundred contestants are divided into two sections of 100 players each. In Round 1, they must answer some questions to determine which of these two sections will proceed to the next round - the section with the most correct answers will continue the game and will therefore be divided into four blocks of 25. These four blocks then play against each other to determine one block of 25 which will proceed to Round 3, the 25 contestants from that block proceed along with a randomly-selected player from one of the other blocks. In Round 3, the players compete as individuals and have to answer more trivia questions, for each correct answer they receive one point for each player who got that question wrong. The two best players face the final elimination round where one question decides who will play the case game. (See Miljoenenjacht for more information.) Unlike the most other early "Deal or No Deal" versions using the original Dutch game play, the Turkish version sees models opening the cases instead of eliminated contenders.

The first contestant on the show, İrem Demirtepe, a 30-year-old graduate of METU, won 110 billion TL. Her case contained 250 billion TL.

== Case values (unclear) ==
Case values (in TL)
100,000	2,000,000,000
250,000	5,000,000,000
500,000	10,000,000,000
1,000,000	15,000,000,000
5,000,000	20,000,000,000
10,000,000	25,000,000,000
20,000,000	30,000,000,000
50,000,000	40,000,000,000
100,000,000	50,000,000,000
150,000,000	100,000,000,000
250,000,000	250,000,000,000
500,000,000	500,000,000,000
1,000,000,000	1,000,000,000,000
