= Miljoenenjacht (Belgian game show) =

Belgian Game Show

The series logo

Miljoenenjacht (Dutch pronunciation: [mɪlˈjunə(n)ˌjɑxt]; English: Hunt for Millions) is the Belgian version of Deal or No Deal. It aired on VTM, debuting on October 16, 2004. It was hosted by Walter Grootaers, with a top prize was €1,000,000. A second season premiered on October 15, 2005. The show later moved to VijfTV, which produced the Flanders version of Deal or No Deal under the title Te Nemen of Te Laten.

== Quiz rounds ==
The game show consisted of five rounds.

=== Preliminary rounds ===
The first three rounds in the show are the same as the Dutch version, although there are only 150 contestants divided into six blocks of 25 players each, labeled from A to F. Three trivia question rounds are played to eliminate these sections one by one until only a single block remains,. The players of this block move on to the next round. One additional player from the remaining 125 contenders is chosen at random, and this player has the opportunity to choose between a valuable prize and a seat in Round 4. If the contestant takes the prize, another eliminated player is randomly selected to be the 26th player.

=== Rounds 4 and 5 ===
The 26 contestants in Round 4 answer eight multiple-choice questions. If a contestant answers correctly, they receive one point for each other player who answered incorrectly. Wrong answers are worth nothing. Two contenders with the highest points advance to Round 5.

In Round 5, the two remaining contestants face each other and they are given an option to leave the game with a valuable prize. If neither accepts the offer, the host asks a math question to determine the one who goes to the final.

=== Final ===
In the Final, there are 26 closed briefcases that contain the values from €0.01 to €1,000,000. The winner in Round 5 chooses one of the briefcases to keep until the end of the game. The other 25 each hold one of the remaining briefcases and the contestant guesses the amount in the case when the contestant chooses it. Correct guesses receives €100 for each unopened case remaining.

The final is the case-picking game similar to the Dutch version and many franchises of Deal or No Deal worldwide.

==== Case Values ====
€0.01	€1,000
€0.20	€3,000
€0.50	€5,000
€1	€10,000
€5	€15,000
€10	€20,000
€20	€25,000
€50	€50,000
€100	€100,000
€200	€200,000
€300	€300,000
€400	€500,000
€500	€1,000,000

== Te Nemen of Te Laten ==
Later in its run, the show switched networks, moving to VijfTV. The VijfTV edition, which is the Flanders version of Deal or No Deal, was broadcast under the title, Te Nemen of Te Laten. The show was hosted by Dré "Felice" Steemans. The top prize was €200,000, and the prize money was shared with a randomly selected premium line caller. This version was cancelled after the death of Felice in October 2009.

=== Box Values ===
Note: Some small values may be replaced with joke prizes.

€0.01
€0.10
€0.50
€1
€5
€10
€50
€100
€250
€500
€750

€1,000
€3,000
€5,000
€10,000
€15,000
€20,000
€25,000
€50,000
€75,000
€100,000
€200,000
