= Áll az alku =

Hungarian television series

- Presented by: Gábor Gundel Takács (2004–2006, 2017–2019); Áron Kovács (2009–2010)
- Country of origin: Hungary

Production
- Running time: 130 minutes (2004–2005), 50 minutes (with commercials, 2006–2019)

Original release
- Network: TV2
- Release: 2004 – 2019

Áll az alku (Hungarian pronunciation: [ˈaːlː ˈɒz ˈɒlku], English: It's a deal) is the Hungarian version of Deal or No Deal, originally created by the Dutch company Endemol. The show aired on TV2, and the host was Gábor Gundel Takács. There are 21 cases used in the format, with a top prize of 50,000,000 forints offered originally and increased to 100,000,000 forints on October 2, 2006 but reduced to 21,000,000 forints in 2009.

The show's first version, broadcast in 2004, aired on Friday nights and was a more than two-hour event similar to the Dutch original show "Miljoenenjacht" : 200 players were divided into two teams of 100 players each which faced of in a quick trivia round. The victorious team was then split into 5 blocks of 20 players each – these blocks played another round similar to the first one. The 20 players from the winning block progressed to the third round, as well as a 21st person randomly selected from the rest of the groups. In Round 3, the 21 contenders all played for themselves to obtain as much points as possible by answering a further few questions. At the end of this round, only two contenders qualified for the semi-final. One of these two players could opt out at this point, receiving a prize, however, if neither player did, a head-to-head round was played. The winner of this round got to choose one of the 21 metal cases to be their own, with the other twenty eliminated players getting their own cases. The twenty players could also win a part of the money in their cases if they guessed the contents of them correctly before opening them.

The show underwent a format change in 2006, with a revamp of the set and the running time reduced to thirty minutes. The question rounds were dropped in favour of a quicker game comprising only the case-opening. The show's new timeslot of every weekday night turned out as an unexpected success in ratings, so the programme's length was extended to 60 minutes, resulting in an unprecedented ratings victory over RTL Klub's previously unbeatable prime time soap opera Barátok közt (Among Friends). The show in its new format continued to air until the end of 2006.

The show's ratings were disappointing due to the daily air period. TV2 purchased the 1 vs. 100 format and aired in 2007. The show then returned in 2009, hosted by Áron Kovács. The format was similar to the American version, albeit with only 21 cases rather than the typical 26, and the top prize was reduced to 21,000,000 forints, which was won in April 2010.

Áll az alku aired again weekdays on TV2 from 28 August 2017. The main prize is 50,000,000 forints, which can be doubled to 100,000,000 forints. Gábor Gundel Takács returned as host of the show. The number of cases increased from 21 to 22+1 (the twenty-third case which includes 4 small cases will only be chosen at the end of the game).

== Case Values ==
=== 2004–2005 ===
1 Ft	200,000 Ft
100 Ft	400,000 Ft
1,000 Ft	600,000 Ft
5,000 Ft	800,000 Ft
10,000 Ft	1,000,000 Ft
20,000 Ft	1,500,000 Ft
25,000 Ft	3,000,000 Ft
50,000 Ft	5,000,000 Ft
75,000 Ft	10,000,000 Ft
100,000 Ft	25,000,000 Ft
	50,000,000 Ft

=== 2006 ===
1 Ft	600,000 Ft
?	750,000 Ft
1,000 Ft	1,000,000 Ft
??	JOKER
25,000 Ft	1,500,000 Ft
???	3,000,000 Ft
75,000 Ft	6,000,000 Ft
100,000 Ft	10,000,000 Ft
200,000 Ft	20,000,000 Ft
300,000 Ft	50,000,000 Ft
400,000 Ft

=== 2009-2010 ===
100 Ft	1,000,000 Ft
1,000 Ft	1,250,000 Ft
?	JOKER
5,000 Ft	2,000,000 Ft
10,000 Ft	2,500,000 Ft
??	3,000,000 Ft
50,000 Ft	5,000,000 Ft
100,000 Ft	7,000,000 Ft
200,000 Ft	13,000,000 Ft
???	21,000,000 Ft
500,000 Ft

=== 2017 ===
1,000 Ft	800,000 Ft
?	1,000,000 Ft
20,000 Ft	JOKER
30,000 Ft	3,000,000 Ft
40,000 Ft	4,000,000 Ft
50,000 Ft	5,000,000 Ft
75,000 Ft	8,000,000 Ft
100,000 Ft	10,000,000 Ft
200,000 Ft	15,000,000 Ft
??	25,000,000 Ft
600,000 Ft	50,000,000 Ft

=== 2018–2019 ===
1,000 Ft	800,000 Ft
?	1,000,000 Ft
20,000 Ft	JOKER
30,000 Ft	3,000,000 Ft
40,000 Ft	4,000,000 Ft
50,000 Ft	5,000,000 Ft
75,000 Ft	8,000,000 Ft
100,000 Ft	10,000,000 Ft
??	15,000,000 Ft
Malaca van!	25,000,000 Ft
600,000 Ft	50,000,000 Ft

The * JOKER * prize is 100,000 Ft multiplied by the number of contestants who get the answer right in the quiz round. For instance, if 15 of the 21 contestants get the answer right, the * JOKER * prize will be 1,500,000 Ft.

"?", "??" and "???" are three different joke prizes.

The case 23 includes 4 smaller cases (marked "A", "B", "C" and "D" like in Greece and North Macedonia) which contain each of the following:

- +1 Millió: 1,000,000 Ft is added to the contestant's winnings.
- Felező: The contestant's winnings are halved.
- Dupla: The contestant's winnings are doubled.
- Semmi: The contestant leaves with nothing. (2017)
- Újra játszhat: The contestant wins nothing, but he/she has a chance to become a contestant on the next show. (2018)
- Hiába: Nothing happens. (2019)
