= Hrayesh chy ne hrayesh? =

Ukrainian television show

- Ukrainian: Граєш чи не граєш?
- Created by: John de Mol; Dick de Ryk
- Presented by: Dmitriy Shepelev
- Country of origin: Ukraine
- No. of episodes: 26

Production
- Running time: 50 minutes (with commercials)

Original release
- Network: Ukraina
- Release: March 7 – December 19, 2010

Hrayesh chy ne hrayesh? (Граєш чи не граєш?), the Ukrainian version of the Deal or No Deal format, is a Sunday prime time television programme broadcast on Ukrainian channel Ukraina. The host is Dmitriy Shepelev and the grand prize is ₴1,000,000. It premiered on March 7, 2010.

== Case values ==
For details of the format see Deal or No Deal. There are 26 cases, containing prizes from ₴1,000,000 to ₴0.01.

0.01	1,000
0.20	5,000
0.50	7,500
1	10,000
5	20,000
10	30,000
50	50,000
100	100,000
200	200,000
300	300,000
400	400,000
500	500,000
750	1,000,000
