= Uzmi ili ostavi =

Serbian TV game show

Uzmi ili ostavi is a Serbian game show that started airing on May 7, 2007 on B92. It was the Serbian version of Endemol's Deal or No Deal, produced locally by Emotion.

Hosted by Milorad Manda Mandić, it had a running time of 45 minutes. The last episode aired on June 12, 2008 and the show has been off the air ever since. The show was scheduled to return sometime in 2009 as another 200 episodes had been ordered.

== Format ==
There were 22 boxes each day. One contestant chooses their own box at the start of the game. The other 21 boxes are opened one by one as the value of the box is found out. At the same time, "the banker" offers a money prize to the contestant. The contestant decides will he take the bank deal (Uzmi - take it) or continue to play and eliminate boxes (Ostavi - leave it).

== Prizes ==
Prizes go from as little as 1 RSD (about 1¢ US) to as big as 1,500,000 RSD (about US$15,900).

1 5 10 25 50 100 250 500 1,000 2,500 5,000	10,000 20,000 30,000 40,000 50,000 100,000 150,000 250,000 500,000 1,000,000 1,500,000

== Croatia version ==
Another show, with the same name, is the Croatian version of Deal or No Deal aired on HRT2 in 2006. Mirko Fodor and Mario Petrekovic are the hosts. There are 21 boxes, with the values range from 0.5kn to 500,000kn.

=== Prizes ===
N/A	1,000kn
0.5kn	2,000kn
1kn	5,000kn
5kn	10,000kn
10kn	15,000kn
25kn	25,000kn
50kn	50,000kn
100kn	75,000kn
200kn	100,000kn
350kn	250,000kn
500kn	500,000kn
