= Dré Steemans =

Belgian TV and radio host (1954-2009)

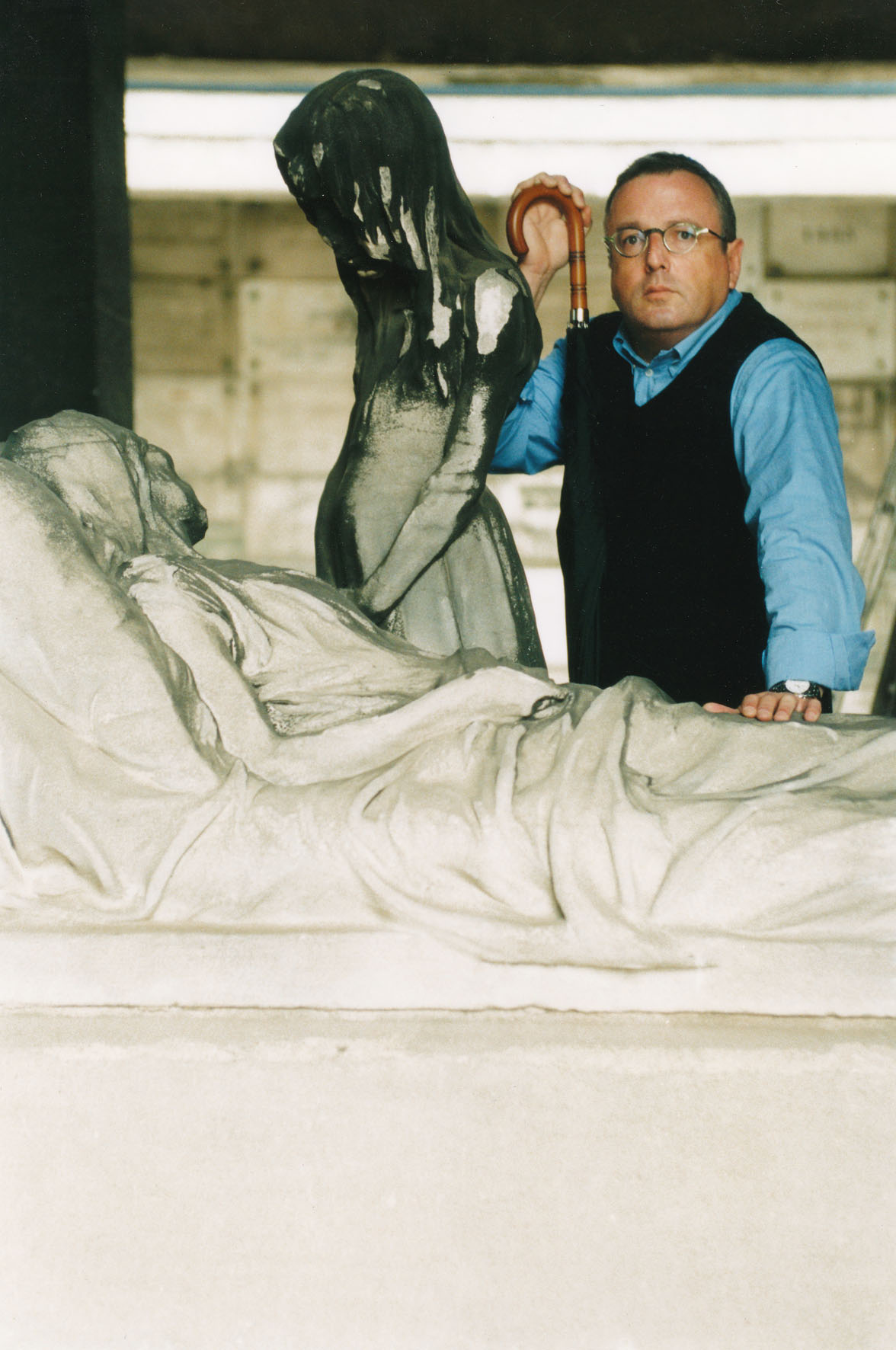
- Born: André Steemans; 1 October 1954; Lubbeek, Belgium
- Died: 9 October 2009 (aged 55); Diest, Belgium
- Other name: Felice
- Years active: 1985–2009

Dré Steemans (better known by his stage name Felice; 1 October 1954 – 9 October 2009) was a Belgian TV and radio host.

== Career ==
Steemans made his broadcast debut on 1 September 1985 in the radioshow Het Genootschap of Luk Saffloer, in which he started using his alter ego Felice Damiano. After this success he presented on Thursday evening his first show Felice on the BRT.

Soon afterwards he got his own talk show, Incredible. One of the more infamous fragments in this show saw Jan Bucquoy using two figs to mimick Queen Fabiola's genitals.

In 1992, he started with Herwig Van Hove for the VRT the cooking show 1000 seconden, that aired for more than 10 years.

Felice was perhaps most famous for the show Het Swingpaleis, a sing along show that he presented from 1996 until 2006 on VRT. In the summer months, he presented a similar show called Biebabeloela.

He also presented the talk show Als God in Frankrijk and game show's like Als je haar maar goed zit!.

He was also present at the cradle of the radio station Radio Donna. He had a cooking item in the show Vrouwentongen of Leen Demaré. In the summer months when he was at the camp site of Chiro Maasmechelen the presented his item live from the campsite where he cooked for the children.

On 15 March 2006, the VRT announced that Steemans transfers to SBS, that own the stations VT4 and VijfTV.

In October 2006, he took part in the film Mineurs by Fulvio Wetzl, in the role of Chef of the Mine of Beringen, Dalskaert.

For VIJFtv, he presented each weekday the popular game show Te Nemen of Te Laten, while for VT4 he hosted Supertalent in Vlaanderen.

Afterwards, he completed a BA in History and Politics, later carrying this on to a master's degree. He went on to obtain a doctoral degree, becoming Dr Dre Streemens.

He hosted the first version of Boobytrap in the Netherlands as well.

On 9 October 2009, just after his 55th birthday, he suddenly died in his sleep from cardiac arrest.

== Chiro Maasmechelen ==
Every summer (when he was available), Dré was the cook at the summer camp of Chiro Maasmechelen, where he didn't want to be called Felice. Even though he was an entertainer (even at the summer camp), he was there as a private person and not as a celebrity.
