= Taip arba Ne =

Lithuanian television gameshow

Taip arba Ne is the Lithuanian version of the television gameshow Deal or No Deal. It is hosted by singer/journalist Marijonas Mikutavičius.

There are 22 cases with values go from as little as 5 litai (about US$1.93, €1.45, 98p, ¥230) to 500,000 litai (about US$193,000, €145,000, £98,000, ¥23,000,000). Later it was reduced to 20 cases with 200,000 litai as the top prize.

== Case values ==
=== 2007–2009 ===
Lt 5
Lt 10
Lt 15
Lt 20
Lt 25
Lt 50
Lt 100
Lt 200
Lt 300
Lt 400
Lt 500

Lt 1,000
Lt 5,000
Lt 10,000
Lt 20,000
Lt 30,000
Lt 40,000
Lt 50,000
Lt 75,000
Lt 100,000
Lt 250,000
Lt 500,000

=== 2010 ===
Lt 5
Lt 10
Lt 25
Lt 50
Lt 100
Lt 200
Lt 300
Lt 400
Lt 500
Lt 750

Lt 1,000
Lt 3,000
Lt 5,000
Lt 10,000
Lt 20,000
Lt 30,000
Lt 50,000
Lt 75,000
Lt 100,000
Lt 200,000
