= Deal Or No Deal Indonesia =

- Genre: Game show
- Based on: Deal or No Deal by John de Mol Jr.
- Starring: Tantowi Yahya, 26 Models (season 1); Deddy Corbuzier, 26 Models (season 2); Cak Lontong (season 3)
- Country of origin: Indonesia

Production
- Camera setup: Multicamera setup
- Running time: 60 min. (2007–2008, 2014–2015); 90 min. (2011–2012)

Original release
- Network: RCTI (2007–2008) antv (2011–2012); Global TV (2014–2015)
- Release: May 19, 2007 – January 29, 2015

On May 19, 2007, Indonesia launched its own version of Deal or No Deal, called Deal or No Deal Indonesia, hosted by Tantowi Yahya, previously host of that country's version of Who Wants to Be a Millionaire?. The prizes range from as little as Rp500 (US$0.04), to as much as Rp2,000,000,000 (US$167,000). The set and rules of the game are the same as the US version.

On December 1, 2011, season 2 premiered on antv, hosted by Deddy Corbuzier. The top prize was Rp1,000,000,000 (US$83,000).

On October 20, 2014, season 3 premiered on Global TV, hosted by Cak Lontong. The top prize is Rp500,000,000 (US$42,000).

== Money Tree ==
=== Season 1 (RCTI) ===
Rp.500
Rp.1,000
Rp.5,000
Rp.10,000
Rp.25,000
Rp.50,000
Rp.100,000
Rp.250,000
Rp.500,000
Rp.1,000,000
Rp.2,500,000
Rp.5,000,000
Rp.7,500,000

Rp.10,000,000
Rp.15,000,000
Rp.30,000,000
Rp.50,000,000
Rp.75,000,000
Rp.100,000,000
Rp.150,000,000
Rp.200,000,000
Rp.300,000,000
Rp.400,000,000
Rp.500,000,000
Rp.1,000,000,000
Rp.2,000,000,000

=== Season 2 (antv) ===
Rp.100
Rp.500
Rp.1,000
Rp.5,000
Rp.10,000
Rp.20,000
Rp.30,000
Rp.40,000
Rp.50,000
Rp.100,000
Rp.250,000
Rp.500,000
Rp.750,000

Rp.1,000,000
Rp.5,000,000
Rp.10,000,000
Rp.20,000,000
Rp.30,000,000
Rp.40,000,000
Rp.50,000,000
Rp.75,000,000
Rp.100,000,000
Rp.125,000,000
Rp.200,000,000
Rp.250M + 1 car
Rp.1,000,000,000

=== Season 3 (Global TV) ===
Rp.100
Rp.1,000
Rp.10,000
Rp.25,000
Rp.50,000
Rp.100,000
Rp.200,000
Rp.300,000
Rp.400,000
Rp.500,000

Rp.1,000,000
Rp.2,500,000
Rp.5,000,000
Rp.10,000,000
Rp.25,000,000
Rp.50,000,000
Rp.75,000,000
Rp.100,000,000
Rp.250,000,000
Rp.500,000,000
