= Telemetro =

- Type: Free-to-air television network
- Country: Panama

Programming
- Language: Spanish
- Picture format: 1080i HDTV

Ownership
- Owner: Corporación Medcom
- Sister channels: RPC

History
- Launched: October 13, 1981; 45 years ago

Links
- Website: www.telemetro.com

Availability

Terrestrial
- Analog VHF: Channel 13 (listings may vary)
- Digital UHF: Channel 44

Telemetro is a television network headquartered in Panama City, Panama, with repeaters throughout the country. The station broadcasts in NTSC format and in Panama City also in DVB-T format. In 1996 Telemetro and RPC TV merged and formed Corporacion Medcom.

Main programming consists on news, novelas, and local reality shows; it has a direct rivalry with TVN since it has similar programming.

== History ==
=== Early years ===
In 1981, Nicolas Gonzalez Revilla founded Telemetro as a metropolitan VHF scrambled pay-per-view channel. The first broadcast was held on October 13, starting at 4pm and ending at 10pm. The initial style of the channel was based exclusively on movies from the Golden Age of Hollywood, which was an obligation given the market conditions and the competition for content at the time of its creation.

The initial plan was to make Telemetro a cable channel. However the original plan was scrapped as soon as it was discovered that the content providers rejected if the service was to be launched on cable. Facing this situation, and the lack of other places to obtain content, as well as the commercial strategies of the existing private television stations in Panama, caused the project to convert to over-the-air terrestrial. Revilla would go on to start his own cable TV provider, Cable Onda, which transmitted in a closed, cable TV system and would also adopt MMDS. Buying content to fill the schedule was difficult in an initial stage, however the ambitions of the negotiating team led by Analida López caused a shift in the strategies. Cable Onda would later become part of Medcom alongside Telemetro.

The station's initial team consisted of thirteen people, at a challenging period where commercial television was dominated by two companies (RPC and Tevedos/TVN), without giving room for new television channels. The situation was broken on October 22, 1980, when the government revised its laws on television stations.

The station was the first in Panama to use computer graphics, as well as the first to make full-on program promotions, unlike its competitors, who at the time relied exclusively on static slides and live announcements. Despite its initial obstacles, Telemetro allowed the broadcast of three daily movies from the past. The station employed the U-matic videotape system, while the portable cameras used were divided in two parts, camera and recorder. All this equipment occupied the small facilities and had a large storage; to circumvent this problem, it was suggested that larger facilities would be needed to accommodate such equipment. The way the channel did commercial advertising was equally disruptive, with ten minutes per hour to insert commercials, where "cheap style" commercials wouldn't be allowed because this would go against the channel's image of a cable - though terrestrial - network. The format wasn't successful and was later replaced by a free-to-air service.

Influenced by the then-recent launch of MTV, the channel's first locally made program was created: Los Grandes de la Música, a music video program aimed at the youth. The channel also started expanding its signal, which also meant searching for new audiences, starting in the Atlantic zone of the country, specifically in Colón.

The station started broadcasting to Colón in 1983 on channel 7 with a special edition of Los Grandes de la Música. Its identifications started displaying the frequencies for both Panama and Colón (13 and 7) and added the slogan "de costa a costa". The new slogan implied its ambition to grow to ultimately become a national channel.

The news operation launched in 1982 during the commercial breaks under the name Boletín del 13. The following year, a full hour-long newscast started, competing against RPC and TVN's counterparts, with its own unique style. It was later renamed Telemetro Reporta.

In December 1989, a special four-day edition of Telemetro Reporta was broadcast, showing all the footage that was withheld from broadcast during the dictatorship, which had just ended.

=== Growth ===
The station's initial facilities showed clear limitations in the creation of new national productions. Negotiations with Martinez Blanco, one of the pioneer entertaining figures of Panamanian television, led to the creation of Sábados con Martinez Blanco. Following the agreement, a second studio was set up. Martinez Blanco's format ended in late 1987, after some jokes from the presenter were poorly received by the governants. To replace the format, a new program was created, Éntrese a ganar (also styled En13 a ganar), on Sundays from January 1988.

The broadcast of Mexican telenovelas at 7pm, in the Cine Series slot (Cine Series being the name given by Telemetro to telenovelas in order to make it different from its competitors), caused competition from reruns of El Chavo del Ocho, whose rights holder in Panama had to move to 5pm in order to allow Telemetro to win the slot. By the end of the decade, Telemetro had produced a large amount of national productions, including daily formats, which was unusual at the time.

=== Achieving nationwide coverage ===
By 1990, Telemetro had started broadcasting live Carnaval events, as well as a new format for the January-March period: Hot Control. Hot Control, the natural successor of Éntrese a ganar, was the first program made specifically for Panama's summer period. The success of Hot Control cemented its relations with the viewing audience, who had increased the channel's popularity. The success of the channel in the Panama and Colón areas led to videotaped copies of Telemetro programming being sent to family members outside of Telemetro's coverage area. The arrival of democracy in 1990 enabled the channel to finally expand to new provinces in Central Panama: Coclé, Herrera, Los Santos and Veraguas. A special event was held in Chitré on August 31 and September 1, 1991, the city was selected due to, among others, the hotel infrastructure used for the guests.

In 1992, the channel had finally expanded to Chiriquí and Bocas del Toro provinces, achieving total nationwide coverage. A special event was held on the December 5-6 weekend of that year, known as El Evento-T. Up until then, areas not covered by the network only knew about its programming by means of videotapes. The station now had plans to become the leading network, and adopted a new slogan to reflect its total coverage, "El canal que llega más" (The channel that reaches more). With this, Telemetro cemented its position as a channel that connected with the Panamanian identity, and Evento-T sealed its status at reaching national level. The network had also increased in the number of homegrown talents, creating the "Las caras de Telemetro" campaign.

The channel helped popularize new sports to Panama from 1994 onwards. Founder Nicolás González Revilla held negotiations with a FIFA official in Los Angeles to help popularize soccer, whereas that same year the channel broadcast the first broadcast of a Panamanian basketball match, without the support of the Panamanian Basketball Federation. Up until then, the dominant sports were baseball and boxing, broadcast primarily by RPC TV. The negotiations between the channel's founder and FIFA also helped create the ANAPROF league, the Panamanian professional soccer league.

=== MEDCOM era ===
The first national work of fiction produced by Telemetro, a sitcom called Los Vergara, premiered in 1998, which aired once a week. Produced by Franco Holness, it was about a family from the inland region who moved to the capital to pursue a millionary lifestyle, without leaving behind their traits from their birthplace. By the efforts of external producer Carlos Pasquini, two new sitcoms followed in 1999: Familia Crisis and Doble Vida, with a more daring and irreverent comic style.

Telemetro Canal Club was created in 2002. It was a community where fans of the channel received special benefits for birthdays, taking part in Hot Control's audience, discount in participated stores, among others. The launch of the club featured the network's calendar with its female talent, its success led to 167,000 people signing up - at a time before social media - in just one day. The process was done manually.

On March 24, 2005, Telemetro Reporta broadcast for the final time from the Calle 50 studios, the first broadcast from the 12 de Octubre studios was held on March 28. A regional bulletin for Chiriquí started in August 2008, which was broadcast on its sister cable news channel, ECO TV.

The current morning format, Tu Mañana, premiered on June 25, 2007. It was the first of its kind on Panamanian television; within a month, it was already leading the ratings.

Telemetro produces its first reality show in 2008, Señorita Bella, which followed the training period of the candidates for the Señorita Panamá pageant, where the winner would represent Panama at Miss Universe. A second season was created in 2009.

Between 2009 and 2013, Telemetro changed to a tapeless format, digitizing its archives.

Telemetro also entered the film industry in 2009 with the creation of TV movies financed by MEDCOM's CSR projects and with co-financing from USAID. The movie "Guetto: el destino no es igual para todos" tackled violence in impoverished areas, and became a ratings hit. A sequel premiered in 2012 (Guetto 2: El Poder de 5) which replicated its success.

On April 4, 2011, Telemetro became the first Panamanian television channel to broadcast in high definition, on Cable Onda channel 321. The channel had received such equipment in the previous year.

In April 2012, Telemetro signed an agreement with La Estrella. A five-year agreement with Globo's international sales division was inked in October 2014. The launch titles of the deal were Amor à Vida, miniseries O Canto da Sereia and O Sucessor and the two Até Que a Sorte nos Separe movies.

El Picador became Telemetro's first production to include international actors, which began filming in 2015 and premiered the following year.

Telemetro was also the first channel to bring Turkish series to Panama, creating what was colloquially known as the "Turkish mania" (La Turcomanía). Its news operation was revamped in 2014 and early 2017, both of which with support from PopUp Media 360. In the latter revamp, a tactile videowall was added for the presenter to make annotations.

The channel's master control system was changed in 2020 with just two strong servers, replacing the system adopted in 1998, with 20 servers, which was by then obsolete.

== Identity ==
=== Logo ===
- 1981-1991: The logo was a combined TM symbol, with the T section being separated. It was made of yellow, orange, red and blue lines. The TELEMETRO wordmark below followed the same color pattern. In station IDs from 1983, a version using a striped 7 following the same pattern as the capital's station was used.
- 1991-1994: With the channel achieving national coverage, the previous logo, which alluded to the capital's frequency (13) was replaced by a metallic T. The channel was now known as Telemetro Panamá.
- 1994-1995: The T mark becomes yellow.
- 1995-2000: A silver ring is added to the T.
- 2000-2004: The T and the ring merge to create a new silver logo, with a detached arch above the T, forming a near-perfect circle.
- 2004-2005: The T-ring logo becomes white and is inserted inside an orange box with a rounded corner and a green rectangle with the channel's name below. According to the channel, the usage of orange reflects the brand's attributes: quality, freshness, youthfulness and proximity.
- 2005-2007: The green box is removed and the bottom-left corner of the box becomes rounded.
- 2007-present: The current logo is introduced, which later gained a 3D version as a perfect sphere. This consists of the two-sided T being connected by a perfect ring, which up until then, was broken.

The 2007 rebranding campaign which introduced the network's current logo was made by Argentine company Steinbranding, in its second rebranding operation in Panama. It reflected Panamanian daily life using photos and used a variety of colors, dominated by orange, the corporate color.

=== Slogans ===
The slogans of the channel have also reflected the channel's milestones:

- Su canal de película (launch)
- Su canal de película, de costa a costa (launch in Colón)
- Telemetro es auténtico
- Fuera de serie
- El canal que llega más (arrival to the central provinces)
- Mucho más canal para muchos más panameños
- Un canal para todo el mundo (2000–2006)
- Aquí está tu gente (2007–2008)
- Mas cerca de tí (2008–2014)
- Parte de tu vida (2014–present)

== Programming ==
=== Current programming ===
==== News ====
- Telemetro Reporta
- Tu Mañana
- Debate Abierto
- Cara a Cara
- Flor Mizrachi Pregunta

==== Reality/non-scripted ====
- Calle 7
- Yo Me Llamo
- A Lo Panameño
- Más que Cine
- Toy o No Toy
- Quien TV
- Da' Flow

==== Telenovela ====
- La Rosa de Guadalupe
- Como dice el dicho
- Golden Boy

=== Former programming ===
==== News ====
- Código 4
- De Mujeres y de Todo
- Stilos

==== Reality/non-scripted ====
- Bailando por un Sueño
- Calle 13
- Conéctate
- Deal or No Deal
- El Familión Nestlé
- El Show de Cristina
- El Show de Pepina y Tortón
- Infraganti
- La Trinchera Pub-Bar
- Los Compadres
- Los Vergara
- Parecen Noticias
- Reggaemania
- TC Club
- TV Trastadas
- Video Conécta-T
- Zoom

==== Telenovela ====
- Amantes de luna llena
- Así son ellas
- Ecomoda
- El clon
- El man es Germán
- El precio del silencio
- Juan Joyita
- La intrusa
- Las Juanas
- Las vías del amor
- Pedro el escamoso
- Sol de tentación
- Soy tu dueña
- Violetta
- Yo soy Betty, la fea

==== Drama ====
- Burke's Law
- Neon Rider
- The Hitchhiker

==== Comedy ====
- Chespirito
- The Benny Hill Show
- USA High

==== Children's programming ====
- Adventures of the Gummi Bears
- Dungeons & Dragons
- Dragon Ball
- Jem
- Maya the Honey Bee
- My Little Pony
- The Legend of Prince Valiant
- The Super Mario Bros. Super Show!

== Mall TV ==
Mall TV
- Country: Panama
- Broadcast area: Panama City, Panama
- Headquarters: Ave. 12 Octubre

Programming
- Language: Spanish

Ownership
- Owner: Corporacion Medcom
- Sister channels: RPC-TV, Telemetro

History
- Launched: July 10, 2001
- Closed: March 20, 2020
- Former names: Tele 7

Links
- Website: www.medcom.com.pa

Availability

Terrestrial
- VHF: 7
- DVB-T: 43

Originally launched in 2005 as a kids programming channel under the brand of Tele 7, In 2011 the channel was relaunched as Mall TV to feature local shopping stores advertisements, real estate development, health clinics and infomercials. The channel was previously only available to Cable Onda customers, which was also owned by Medcom. The channel is also available in many provinces by cable on Cable Onda. In 2017 its over-the-air signal was replaced with Oye TV, a variety channel. It closed in 2020.
