= Kutia (game show) =

Albanian television game show (2004-2011)

Kutia (Albanian for "box"), previously known as Kutia e fundit (Last Box), is the Albanian version of Deal or No Deal. It is produced by TV Klan and aired at every weeknight from September 2004 to December 2011. It was hosted by Enkel Demi.

The format was similar to Affari Tuoi, but this show has 26 boxes instead of 20. Originally, the player could win as big as €5,000 or as small as €0.01. The top prize was later raised to €10,000. Like Pacco X and Pacco Y of Affari Tuoi, there was a Kutia X contains a mysterious prize.

In the first half of 2010, the top prize was doubled to €20,000, and a Kutia Y was added as well.

A new season started on September 6, 2010, and the top prize was further increased to €25,000. On October 13, 2010, the top prize was revealed in the player's box after the player rejected the final offer of €5,000 while another remaining box contained €2,000, but his winning was halved to €12,500 after playing an additional game.

== Box values ==
=== With €5,000 top prize ===
€0.01
€0.20
€0.50
€1
€3
€5
€10
€15
€20
€30
€40
€60
€80

€100
€150
€200
€250
€300
€350
€400
€500
€1,000
€1,500
€2,000
€3,000
€5,000

=== With €10,000 top prize ===
€0.01
€0.05
€0.10
€0.20
€0.50
€1
€2
€5
€10
€15
€20
€30
€50

KUTIA X
€150
€200
€250
€300
€400
€500
€600
€800
€1,000
€2,000
€4,000
€10,000

=== With €20,000 top prize ===
€0.01
€0.05
€0.10
€0.20
€0.50
€1
€2
€5
€10
€15
€20
KUTIA X
€50

€100
€150
€200
€250
KUTIA Y
€400
€500
€600
€800
€1,000
€2,000
€4,000
€20,000

=== With €25,000 top prize ===
€0.01
€0.05
€0.10
€0.20
€0.50
€1
€2
€5
€10
€15
€20
KUTIA X
€50

€100
€150
€200
€250
KUTIA Y
€400
€500
€600
€800
€1,000
€2,000
€5,000
€25,000
