= Guido Cantz =

German television presenter

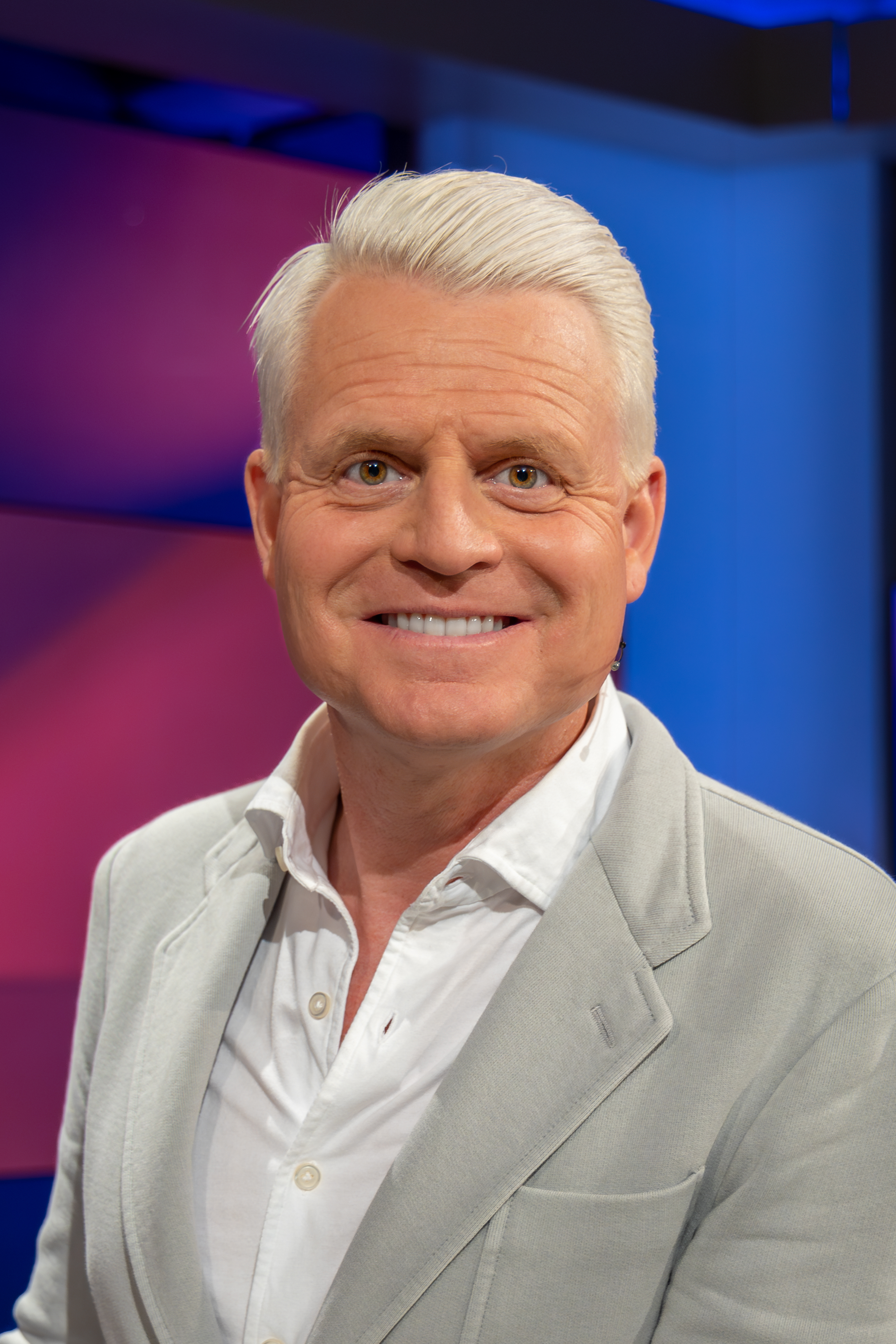
- Cantz in 2023
- Born: 19 August 1971 (age 55); Porz, North Rhine-Westphalia, Germany
- Citizenship: German
- Occupations: Comedian; television presenter
- Years active: 1991–present
- Spouse: Kerstin Cantz
- Children: 1 son
- Website: guidocantz.de

Guido Cantz (born August 19, 1971) is a German television presenter and comedian. His trademark is his blonde dyed hair.

== Career ==
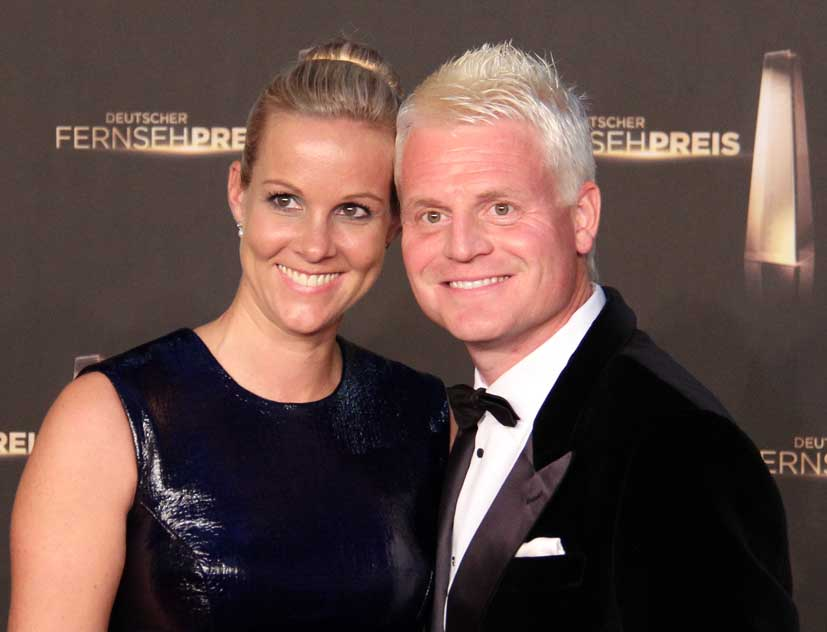
Guido Cantz with his wife at the Deutscher Fernsehpreis in 2012

From 1991 to 1994, he studied Business Administration at the University of Cologne, followed by an apprenticeship as a state-certified commercial media assistant at the Joseph-DuMont-Berufskolleg.

Since 1991, Cantz has appeared as a stand-up comedian at the Cologne Carnival, performing up to 200 times per season. Since 2015, he has been one of the two lead commentators for the live broadcast of the Cologne Rosenmontag parade on WDR television.

Since 1998, he works for German broadcasters. Aside from guest appearances on comedy and satire shows like Quatsch Comedy Club and TV Total, he was the host of game shows such as Deal or No Deal. Starting in 2010, he hosted the live Saturday-evening show Verstehen Sie Spaß? on Das Erste, and from 2013, Verstehen Sie was? on SWR Fernsehen. In June 2021, it was announced that Cantz would step down as host at the end of 2021. Barbara Schöneberger succeeded him.

Cantz appeared as a rotating quiz partner alongside fellow comedian Alice Hoffmann on the panel of the show Meister des Alltags (SWR). He has been touring Germany with his own stage shows since 2006 and celebrated his 25th stage anniversary, dubbed "Blondiläum", in 2017. Guido Cantz is the author of several books. Furthermore, he serves as a co-commentator for the SWR1 Hitparade.

In 2022, Cantz appeared in several formats on RTL; the satirical panel talk show 7 Tage, 7 Köpfe was relaunched in January, with Guido Cantz taking on the role of a host. He also hosted the relaunch of the betting show Ich setz auf Dich, which aired in July and December. As both formats achieved only weak ratings, the broadcaster decided against continuing them.

In the same year, Cantz was a contestant in the second season of the game show Der König der Kindsköpfe, which he won.

In late September 2023, it was announced that Cantz would host the relaunch of Glücksrad on RTL Zwei starting in 2024, succeeding Thomas Hermanns.

After the death of his mother in June 2026, he cancelled several tour dates.

== Family and private life ==
Cantz was born as the son of Otto and Irmhild Cantz and has a brother. He is a descendant of the reformator Kaspar Cantz, who wrote the first known Protestant agenda, and, according to himself, the 10th cousin once removed of Albert II of Monaco. Since 2009, he is married to Kerstin Cantz and is the father of a son. They live in Porz, Cologne.

He is Roman Catholic and has served as an altar server when he was younger.

Cantz is an active association football player for the SSV Troisdorf 05 veterans' team. He previously played for Spvg Wahn-Grengel in the Landesliga and 1. FC Spich in the Bezirksliga. He regularly plays for the Lotto-Elf Rheinland-Pfalz (alongside former professionals such as Wolfgang Overath, Stefan Kuntz, and Dariusz Wosz) for charitable causes. Cantz is a fan of the VfB Stuttgart.

== Criticism ==
In August 2019, the results of a viewer survey of 47 respondents made headlines, describing Cantz as "unfriendly," "arrogant," and "artificial". SWR spokesperson Wolfgang Utz defended Cantz, saying that he and his humour would fit perfectly to the show Verstehen Sie Spaß? and that the viewership ratings would prove this.

== Filmography ==
=== Presenter ===
- since 1991: Karneval in Köln
- since 1998: Sessionseröffnung Kölner Karneval
- 2000–2011: Karnevalissimo
- 2001: TV – TV
- 2002: Elften im Elften – Kölsche Lieder
- 2003: Kölle Alaaf
- 2003: Karneval Hoch Drei
- 2004: Aprés Sno Party
- 2004: Die witzigsten Werbeagenten
- 2004: Die große Edgar-Wallace-Show
- 2004: Reklame!
- 2004: Kenn ich – die witzigste Serienshow
- 2005–2008: Deal or No Deal
- 2008: Wiesn Hits 2008
- 2010-2021: Verstehen Sie Spaß?
- 2011: Die beliebtesten Showmaster
- 2013–2017: Verstehen Sie was?
- 2015: Wie geil ist das denn?
- 2016–2021: SWR3 New Pop Special
- 2017: Flieg mit mir!
- 2018: Für immer Kult
- 2018: Die Montagsmaler
- 2020: Quizz dich auf 1
- since 2022: Wider den tierischen Ernst
- 2022: 7 Tage, 7 Köpfe
- 2022: Der König der Kindsköpfe
- 2022: Ich setz auf Dich
- since 2024: Glücksrad

=== Commentator ===
- since 2015: Rosenmontag parade in Cologne

=== Juror or Panel Member ===
- 2003: Die Gong-Show
- 2012–2025: Meister des Alltags
- 2012: Einfach die Besten!
- 2020: Weinduell
- 2022: Gipfel der Quizgiganten

=== Guest Appearances ===
- 2001–2002: Unter uns (episodes 1681–1715)
- 2003: Fetenhits
- 2003–2010, 2018–2024: Genial daneben
- 2005: Urmel aus dem Eis
- 2009: TV total Eisfußball
- 2009: Die Dreisten Drei (episode 7x02)
- 2011: Schlag den Star
- 2011, 2016, 2020: Die große Maus-Show
- 2014: Pastewka (1 episode)
- 2015–2019: Lachgeschichten
- 2015–2021: Quizduell
- 2016–2020: Hirschhausens Quiz des Menschen
- 2017–2023: Wer weiß denn sowas?
- 2019: Luke! Die Schule und ich
- 2019: Heute-show
- 2021, 2023, 2024: Grill den Henssler
- 2022: Glückwunsch Guido Cantz: 30 Jahre Karneval!
- 2022, 2024: Quizduell Olymp

=== Voice Actor ===
- 2006: The Wild (German voice of Larry)

=== Musical Actor ===
- 2001: Vom Geist der Weihnacht as Charles Dickens
- 2023, 2024: Himmel und Kölle as Saxon-speaking taxi driver

== Comedy ==
Solo shows

- 2006–2007: Cantz schön frech
- 2007–2010: Ich will ein Kind von Dir
- 2012–2015: Cantz schön clever
- 2016–2019: Blondiläum 25 Jahre – Best of Guido Cantz
- 2021–2025: Das volle Programm – Ich sehe was, was du nicht siehst
- 2025: Komische Zeiten

CDs

- 2006: Cantz schön frech
- 2009: Ich will ein Kind von dir!
- 2012: Cantz schön clever (audiobook)
- 2015: Wo ist der Witz (audiobook)
- 2015: Ist das ein Witz? Vol. 3 Kommt ein Entertainer zum Arzt... mit Eckart von Hirschhausen

Books

- 2006: Cantz nah am Ball
- 2012: Cantz schön clever
- 2015: Wo ist der Witz?
- 2021: Bauchgefühl und Gottvertrauen. Mein Leben von 1971 bis 20 Uhr 15 (autobiography)
- 2023: Restaurant CANTZINI Kochbuch

== Awards ==
- 2003: Spitze Feder of the Hauptausschuss Gross-Mülheimer-Karneval 1957 e. V.
- 2004–2006: Närrischer Oscar of the newspaper Express
- 2009: Winner of the TV total Deutscher Eisfußball-Pokal
- 2012: Deutscher Comedypreis for Best Hidden Camera
- 2018: Rheinischer Provinzialpreis
- 2022–2023: Steckenpferdritter der Prinzengarde der Stadt Krefeld 1914 e.V.
- 2023: Gourmand Award
