= Ota tai jätä =

Finnish game show

Ota tai jätä (lit. 'Take or Leave') was Finland's version of the television gameshow Deal or No Deal. It aired at 8:00PM (20.00) on Nelonen (Channel 4 in Finland) and was hosted by Pauli Aalto-Setälä. The show was broadcast from 10 January 2007 to 29 November 2007.

The set of Ota tai jätä is identical to the US version, and there are 26 cases (like most other versions), with amounts ranging from 5 cents (€0.05) to €500,000. The Finnish version featured the first female banker in the show's history.

Sami Lainio is the biggest winner in the Finnish version. He won €200,000.

== Case values ==
Case values ranging from €0.05 to €500,000.

Board 1

€0.05
€0.10
€0.50
€1
€5
€10
€20
€50
€100
€150
€250
€500
€750

€1,000
€1,500
€2,500
€5,000
€10,000
€20,000
€30,000
€40,000
€50,000
€75,000
€100,000
€150,000
€500,000

Board 2

€0.05
€0.10
€0.50
€1
€5
€10
€20
€50
€100
€150
€250
€500
€750

€1,000
€1,500
€2,500
€5,000
€10,000
€20,000
€30,000
€40,000
€50,000
€100,000
€150,000
€200,000
€500,000
