= Da sau nu =

Romanian television series

Da sau nu (English: Yes or No) is the Romanian version of Deal or No Deal, broadcast by Prima TV. It was first hosted by Virgil Ianţu, then replaced by Mihai Dobrovolschi. The grand prize is 150,000 lei, equal to about US$50,000, €41000, or £28,500. The show premiered on September 5, 2005.

== Accepţi sau nu ==
This version in Romania, called Accepţi sau nu, is hosted by Gabriel Coveşanu. It premiered on March 1, 2008, with the top prize of 100,000 lei.
