= Deal or No Deal (South Africa game show) =

South African television game show

Deal or No Deal is a South African game show based on the international franchise of the same name, premiering on 6 March 2023. The show is hosted by Katlego Maboe and airs on SABC 2 (previously on SABC 1). Each episode, one contestant is selected to play against the infamous Banker for a chance to win up to 250,000 South African rand.

== Gameplay ==
The game begins with 20 players, each of whom are holding a red box. Each of the boxes hold a different cash value, ranging from R1 to R250,000 (see Box Values, below). At the start of the game, one of the 20 players is chosen to play the game. The player brings their box to the table. This is their box to keep beside them for the rest of the game, and whichever value is inside their box is the amount they win (unless they decide to sell their box, explained later). They are then asked to open the remaining boxes, eliminating the values within from play. The boxes are opened in rounds, as follows;

- Round 1: 6 boxes to open
- Round 2: 3 boxes to open
- Round 3: 3 boxes to open
- Round 4: 3 boxes to open
- Round 5: 2 boxes to open
- Round 6: 1 box to open

At the end of each round, the host receives a phone call from the Banker, who wants to buy the contestant's box and make them leave the game for as little money as possible. The host then asks the player the title question, "Deal or No Deal?" The player has two options; they can either accept the offer and end the game (by saying "Deal" and pressing the button in front of them) or they can reject the offer and continue playing (by saying "No Deal" and closing the hinged cover over the button). If the contestant rejects every offer, they win what is in their box.

== Box values ==
R1	R5,000
R5	R7,500
R10	R10,000
R50	R20,000
R100	R30,000
R250	R40,000
R500	R50,000
R750	R100,000
R1,000	R150,000
R2,500	R250,000

== Celebrity version ==
On 9 March 2024, a celebrity version (entitled Deal or No Deal Celebrity) premiered on SABC 1. The show is exactly the same as the civilian version, except the red boxes are replaced with silver briefcases, each held by a model. Whatever a celebrity wins is donated to a charity of their choice.
