= El Familión Nestlé =

Panamanian television game show

Four contestants from Guatemala prior to enter the stage of "El Familión Nestlé"

El Familión Nestle is the Panamanian version of the television show Deal or No Deal, it is aired on Telemetro and sponsored by Nestlé. The show also aired in several countries in Central America, including Nicaragua, Guatemala, El Salvador, Honduras and Costa Rica.

The show was hosted by South American personality Nelson Bustamante and featured 24 contestants (four from each Central American country including Panama), each receiving a sealed aluminum suitcase with a logo of a Nestlé product. In the first round the contestants are asked random questions that are answered electronically. The contestant that earns the most points will be allowed to choose a suitcase to open in the second round. Over the course of the game the contestant will choose to eliminate all suitcases except the one chosen at the beginning of the show, though the suitcase may be traded once for a different remaining suitcase. At the game's conclusion the contestant receives a cheque for the amount printed inside the last suitcase opened. The prizes ranged from US$0.01 to US$125,000. The show drew a large audience throughout Central America, and was filmed on Saturdays and aired post edition, three weeks later on a Sunday.

== Case values ==
$0.01	$500
$0.10	$750
$0.25	$1,000
$0.50	$2,500
$1	$5,000
$2	$7,500
$5	$10,000
$10	$25,000
$25	$30,000
$50	$50,000
$100	$75,000
$250	$125,000

== Ecuador version ==
Another show, with the same name, was aired in Gama TV in Ecuador in 2010. It was based on the first version aired in April 2006. Daniel Sarcos is the host. The grand prize of the show is US$100,000.

=== First Board ===
$0.01	$500
$0.10	$750
$0.25	$1,000
$0.50	$2,000
$1	$3,500
$2	$5,000
$5	$10,000
$10	$20,000
$25	$25,000
$50	$40,000
$100	$60,000
$250	$100,000

=== Second Board ===
$0.01	$1,000
$0.50	$1,250
$1	$1,500
$3	$2,000
$5	$3,000
$10	$5,000
$25	$10,000
$50	$20,000
$100	$30,000
$250	$40,000
$500	$60,000
$750	$100,000
