= Dil kam No Dil =

Armenian version of the television gameshow Deal or No Deal

Dil kam No Dil (Armenian language: Դիլ կամ Նո Դիլ) is the Armenian version of the television gameshow Deal or No Deal. It premiered in November 2006, and was produced by Armenia TV.

The set was identical to the American version, and contestants can win as small as AMD 1 (about US$0.0021) and as big as AMD 100,000,000 (about US$210,000).

== Case values ==
AMD 1
AMD 1,000
AMD 2,000
AMD 3,000
AMD 4,000
AMD 5,000
AMD 7,500
AMD 10,000
AMD 15,000
AMD 20,000
AMD 25,000
AMD 50,000
AMD 75,000

AMD 100,000
AMD 200,000
AMD 300,000
AMD 400,000
AMD 500,000
AMD 750,000
AMD 1,000,000
AMD 5,000,000
AMD 10,000,000
AMD 20,000,000
AMD 25,000,000
AMD 50,000,000
AMD 100,000,000
