= Die Chance deines Lebens =

- Genre: Game show
- Presented by: Kai Pflaume
- Country of origin: Germany
- Original language: German
- No. of seasons: 1
- No. of episodes: 6

Production
- Running time: 120–150 minutes
- Production company: Endemol

Original release
- Network: Sat.1
- Release: April 30 – December 18, 2000

Die Chance deines Lebens (English: The Chance of a Lifetime) is the original version of the international game show franchise Deal or No Deal. It was broadcast in Germany by broadcaster Sat.1 from April 30 to December 18, 2000. The show was hosted by Kai Pflaume and had a top prize of 10 million Deutsche Mark (€5,112,919). It lasted for six live episodes.

== Rules ==
There were 1,000 contestants compete in each live show. They were split into ten sections of 100, numbered 1 to 10. Each section was also divided into five blocks of 20, labelled A to E.

=== First format (April–May 2000) ===
In the first two episodes, the format consisted of 10 rounds.

==== Round 1–3 ====
The first round consists of one multiple-choice question with three possible choices. All 1,000 contestants have 6 seconds to answer the question via keypads. They are split into two teams: a red team (sections 1–5) and a blue team (sections 6–10). Each right answer earn the team a point. After the question, the team with most points wins.

In round 2, five sections of the winning team play each other exactly the same way as in round 1, with only one of them proceeding to the next round. Then five blocks of that section pit against each other in round 3. After three rounds, 20 contestants remain.

==== Round 4 ====
All 20 contenders face each other in trivia question duels. For each pair, an open-ended question is asked. The first to buzz in and answer correctly go through to the next round. A wrong answer eliminates the contestant.

==== Round 5 ====
The 10 contenders are split into two groups of five. A video is shown, then each group is asked an estimated-guess question related to the video. In each group, three players with the closest guess proceed.

==== Temptation round 1 ====
Six players now have the chance to take the offer of 10,000 DM and walk away. They are standing next to each other, with every player standing in front of a small circle of neon light installed in the podium floor. If they want to take the offer, they must step forward and touch the circle with their feet, therefore ilumminating the circle. The first to do so leaves the game with the money and is replaced by an audience member selected by the Random Remote of Doom. If no one wants to leave, the Random Remote of Doom choose an audience member to win the money instead.

==== Round 6 ====
The contenders face each other again – in each duel, a multiple-choice question with three possible answers is asked. The first to buzz in and gives the correct answer wins, otherwise the opponent has to pick from two remaining choices to advance.

==== Round 7 ====
An open-ended question is asked, then some clues appear to help the players. Contestants can buzz in at any time – if he's right, he wins a point. The first two contenders with two points each make it to the next round.

After the round, the Random Remote of Doom picks out an audience member to join the winners in round 8.

==== Round 8 ====
The three players have to put seven historical events in chronological order. The player who does it worst is eliminated.

==== Temptation round 2 ====
This round works the same as in the first temptation round, except that a car (valued at 50,000 DM) is offered, and if both contestants decides not to walk away, then 10,000 DM will be added to the offer.

==== Semi-final ====
This is a best-of-seven round: a question is asked, then possible choices slowly come up. If there already have seven choices and no contestants decide to answer, then wrong choices will be disappeared one by one. The contestants can buzz in at any time. If he's right, he wins a point, otherwise the point goes to the opponent. The first to four points advances to the final.

==== Final ====
The winner sits in a red armchair which rises skywards. He starts the round with 1 DM. Seven multiple-choice questions are asked, each with seven possible choices but only one of them is correct. The contestant has 30 seconds to answer each question. For each right answer, a zero is added to the winnings, making the maximum prize 10,000,000 DM.

=== Second format (October–December 2000) ===
Since October 1, 2000, the format of Die Chance deines Lebens was changed, and now consisted of five rounds.

==== Round 1 ====
A video is shown, then a multiple-choice question related to the video is asked. The question has five possible answers, three of them are correct. All 1,000 contestants lock in the choice via keypads, and after the right answers are revealed, five contestants who answered the question correctly in the fastest time are called up onstage to play round 2.

==== Round 2 ====
Each contestant is given five multiple-choice questions, each with five choices, and must answers them for a time limit of 5 minutes. For each correct answer, the money they win increases:

- 1 right: 1,000 DM
- 2 right: 2,500 DM
- 3 right: 5,000 DM
- 4 right: 10,000 DM
- 5 right: 50,000 DM

That money are theirs to keep regardless of the outcome.

==== Temptation round ====
Only three contestants who have most correct answers will be able to go to this round. These players now get the chance to leave the game and walk away with their earned money as well as a brand-new car. If one of the three players decides to walk away, the fourth-placed contender from the previous round replaces them. If no-one of the three competitors leave, a trivia question will be asked to the remaining audience members, with the fasted correctly-responding player winning the car.

==== Round 3 ====
The round works similar as in round 8 of the first format, except that there are only five historical events.

==== Semi-final ====
This round is best-of-five: a multiple-choice question with five possible answers is asked. Every 10 seconds, a wrong choice disappears. Contestants can buzz in at any time. A correct answer wins the contestant a point, otherwise the point goes to the opponent. The first to three points goes to the final, with all the other 99 players from the winner's section gaining DM 1,000 straight away.

==== Final ====
The round works similar as in the final of the first format, except that the time limit is extended to 60 seconds, and the new money ladder is introduced:

- 1 right: 25,000 DM
- 2 right: 50,000 DM
- 3 right: 100,000 DM
- 4 right: 250,000 DM
- 5 right: 500,000 DM
- 6 right: 1,000,000 DM
- 7 right: 10,000,000 DM

=== Episode 6 (December 18, 2000) ===
In the sixth episode, five finalists from previous shows were invited to the show again and tried to receive another chance to win 10 million DM, with rules of the second format apply.

== Winners ==
In the first two episodes (aired on April 30 and May 7, 2000), the two finalists were Uwe from Sankt Goar and Roy from Bremerhaven, who won 10,000 DM and 100,000 DM respectively.

Under the second format, Andreas Voß became the finalist in the third episode (broadcast on October 1, 2000) after the controversial semi-final round, where Francis Gröning lost due to some technical problems. He won 250,000 DM.

In the fourth episode (aired on October 15, 2000), Florian Lederer became the biggest winner of the series. He won 500,000 DM.

== Ratings ==
The first episode had a rating of 5.41 million viewers and 20.7% share. In the 14–49 age group, it had a 21.6% share. However, the figures gradually dropped. After four episodes, the show only averaged 4.71 million viewers and a 17% share. With ratings being low compare with RTL game show Wer wird Millionär?, Die Chance deines Lebens was later cancelled. Prior to the premiere, Sat.1 executives were hoping for an audience of around 6 million viewers.

== International versions ==
The format later came to the Netherlands in November 2000 as Miljoenenjacht (Hunt for Millions), hosted by Linda de Mol. In December 2002, Miljoenenjacht introduced the case-opening game, which became known in many countries as Deal or No Deal.

Una vez en la vida (Once in a Lifetime), a Spanish game show hosted by Constantino Romero and broadcast on Antena 3 in 2001, was based in this show. In each episode there are 210 contenders competing for a grand prize of 210 million pesetas (€1,262,125).

Country	Name	Hosts	Channel	Premiere date	End date
Netherlands	Miljoenenjacht	Linda de Mol	NPO 2	November 2000	December 2001
Spain	Una vez en la vida	Constantino Romero	Antena 3	2001	2001
