= Miljoenenjacht =

Dutch television game show

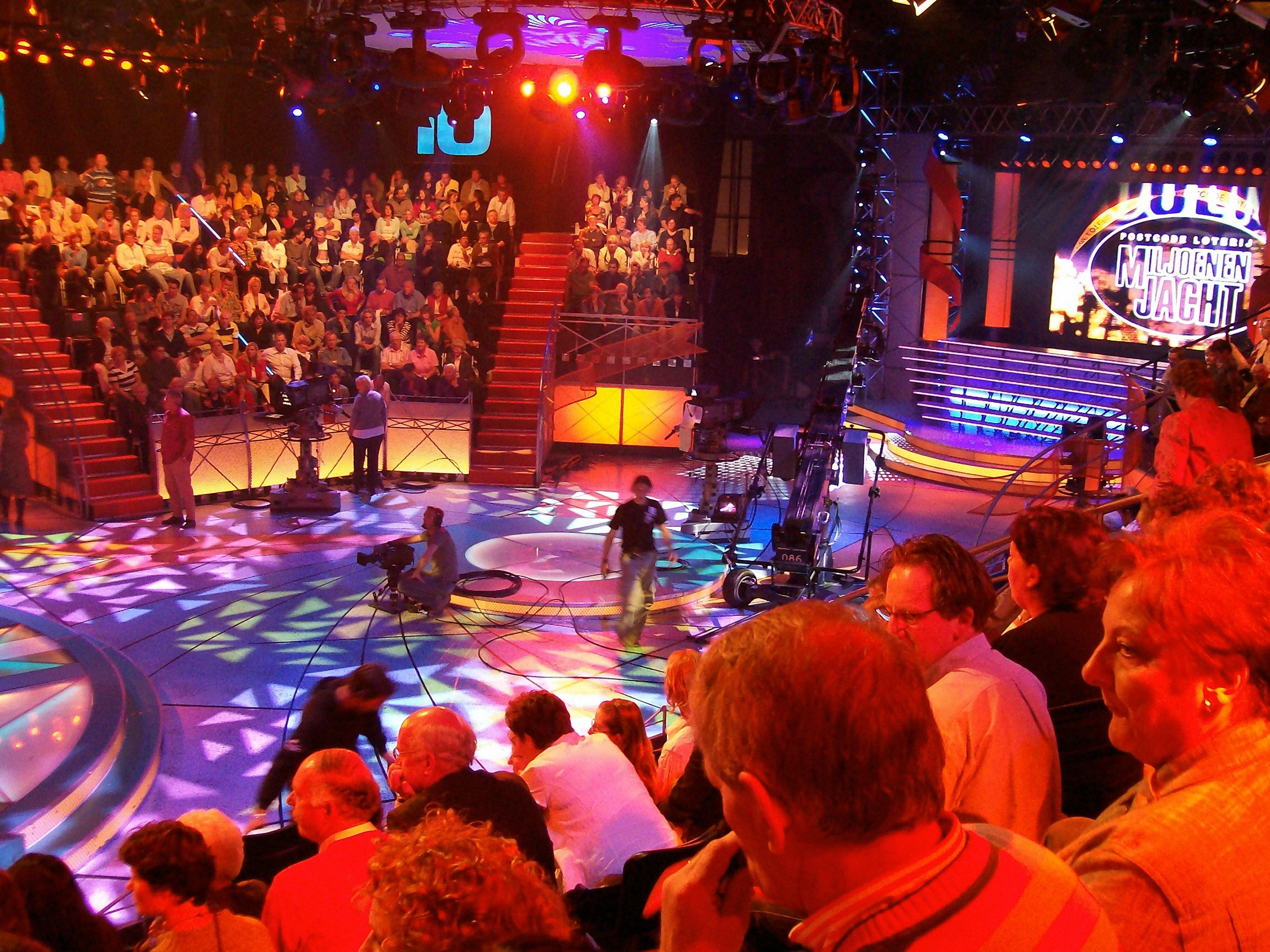
- Also known as: Postcode Loterĳ Miljoenenjacht
- Created by: John de Mol Jr.
- Based on: Die Chance deines Lebens (2000–2002)
- Directed by: Gerben van den Hoven
- Starring: Linda de Mol (2000–present); Winston Gerschtanowitz (co-presenter; fill-in host on October 6, 2013 (Note: Winston Gerschtanowitz hosted the show on October 6, 2013 due to the death of the de Mol brothers' father.))
- Composers: Hans van Eijck (2000–2003); Martijn Schimmer (2003–present)
- Country of origin: Netherlands
- Original language: Dutch

Production
- Running time: 75 minutes
- Production companies: Endemol Shine Nederland; Televisie Radio Omroep Stichting (2000–2005)

Original release
- Network: Nederland 2 (2000–2005); Talpa/Tien (2005–2007); RTL 4 (2007–2019); SBS6 (2019–present)
- Release: November 25, 2000 – present

Miljoenenjacht (Dutch pronunciation: [mɪlˈjunə(n)ˌjɑxt]; English: Hunt for Millions), officially Postcode Loterĳ Miljoenenjacht, is a Dutch game show, sponsored by the country's postcode lottery, where a contestant and an at-home viewer can win up to €5,000,000 (approximately $5,583,720 or £4,390,423) or as little as €0.01. The show was broadcast at various times, with around six episodes for each season. The program was originally shown by TROS on NPO 2, but moved to creator John de Mol's channel Tien in 2005. When the channel was discontinued, after its sale to the RTL Group, the program moved to RTL 4. In 2019, Miljoenenjacht moved to SBS6 due to the transfer of Linda de Mol from RTL to SBS (owned by Talpa).

Originally based on the German game show, Die Chance deines Lebens, the format of the programme's final round, used since 2002, has been exported worldwide by Dutch producer Endemol under the title Deal or No Deal, a title also used for Miljoenenjacht's lower-stakes sister spinoff on RTL 5, which is based more on the global format and removes the additional elements.

== Airings ==
The show began airing in late 2000. In the first season, which aired from November 2000 to September 2001, there was only one show per month (seven shows, plus one special edition in total). Since the Deal or No Deal endgame was introduced, Miljoenenjacht airs two seasons of about five episodes each per year: one in the spring and the other in the fall. A New Year's Eve special aired in 2017 and a New Year's Day special aired in 2019.

Season	From	To	No. of episodes
Spring 2004	March 21, 2004	April 25, 2004	6
Fall 2006	November 19, 2006	December 17, 2006	5
Spring 2007	May 6, 2007	June 3, 2007	5
Fall 2007	November 25, 2007	December 30, 2007	6
Spring 2008	May 4, 2008	June 1, 2008	5
Fall 2008	November 16, 2008	December 28, 2008	7
Spring 2009	March 29, 2009	April 26, 2009	5
Fall 2009	November 15, 2009	December 13, 2009	5
Spring 2010	March 28, 2010	April 25, 2010	5
Fall 2010	November 14, 2010	December 12, 2010	5
Spring 2011	April 3, 2011	May 1, 2011	5
Fall 2011	November 20, 2011	December 18, 2011	5
Spring 2012	April 8, 2012	May 6, 2012	5
Fall 2012	November 11, 2012	December 9, 2012	5
Spring 2013	March 17, 2013	April 14, 2013	5
Fall 2013	October 6, 2013	November 10, 2013	6
Spring 2014	February 9, 2014	March 9, 2014	5
Fall 2014	September 28, 2014	October 26, 2014	5
Spring 2015	March 15, 2015	April 12, 2015	5
Fall 2015	October 25, 2015	November 22, 2015	5
Spring 2016	March 13, 2016	April 10, 2016	5
Fall 2016	October 2, 2016	November 6, 2016	6
Spring 2017	March 19, 2017	April 16, 2017	5
Fall 2017	September 10, 2017	October 8, 2017	5
New Year's Eve special 2017	December 31, 2017	December 31, 2017	1
Spring 2018	March 18, 2018	April 15, 2018	5
Fall 2018	September 2, 2018	September 30, 2018	5
New Year's Day special 2019	January 1, 2019	January 1, 2019	1
Spring 2019	March 3, 2019	March 31, 2019	5
Fall 2019	September 8, 2019	October 6, 2019	5
Spring 2020	(cancelled due to COVID-19 pandemic)		
Fall 2020	August 30, 2020	October 4, 2020	6
Spring 2021	March 7, 2021	April 4, 2021	5
Fall 2021	September 5, 2021	October 10, 2021	6
Spring 2022	(cancelled)		
Fall 2022	September 4, 2022	October 16, 2022	7
Spring 2023	March 5, 2023	April 2, 2023	5
Fall 2023	September 3, 2023	October 1, 2023	5
Spring 2024	March 10, 2024	April 14, 2024	6
Fall 2024	September 29, 2024	November 3, 2024	6
New Year's Day special 2025	January 1, 2025	January 1, 2025	1
Spring 2025	March 9, 2025	April 13, 2025	6
Fall 2025	September 14, 2025	October 26, 2025	7

== Quiz rounds ==
=== Original rules (2000–2001) ===
Every season, one thousand contenders were introduced, each representing their neighborhood. The first round consisted of four multiple-choice questions, each with three possible answers. The contenders were given keypads to answer each of the questions within six seconds. For this round, they were divided into two teams of 500 – a red team (blocks 1–5) and a blue team (blocks 6–10). Each right answer gave their team a point. The team with the most points after four questions (red or blue) advanced to the second round, while the other team was eliminated from the contest. In the second round, the five victorious sections from the first round played each other exactly the same way as in the previous round, with only one of the five sections proceeding to the next round. This pattern continued into Round 3. Whenever two teams achieved the same score, the tied teams were given an additional question, where the speed of answers is used as a tiebreaker.

The 20 winning contenders made it to Round 4, where they faced each other in trivia question duels – in each duel, a question with four possible answers was asked. Contenders buzzed in when they thought they knew the answer. If no-one buzzed in every 10 seconds, one of the wrong answers disappeared. The first contender to buzz in was given the right to answer. If the contender was right, they proceeded – otherwise, they were eliminated and their opponent advanced to the next round. Effectively, only 10 contestants were allowed to proceed.

Round 5 consisted of estimation guess questions (trying to guess the exact quantity of an unclear value, e.g. the weight of an object). After each question, the contestant with the best guess was announced. This player was automatically qualified for the next round. Five questions were asked - again halving the competition.

The five remaining contenders had to put six historical events into chronological order. This game was played twice – after each game, the worst player was eliminated. Only three players proceeded to Round 7 – the Photo Quiz. (In later editions, the game has only been played once, with the two worst players getting eliminated).

At the Photo Quiz, the three contenders were shown 25 pictures, each showing a celebrity (later only 15 pictures) – each photo was an answer to one of the following questions. Open-ended questions were asked in this round – contenders again had to buzz in when they thought they knew the answer. If a contender was right, they gained two points. In case of a wrong answer, their two opponents received one point each. The first two players to 15 points (later changed to 10 points) each made it to the semi-final.

The semi-final consisted of two parts. In the first part, an amount of money starting at 10,000 guilders (about $5,586.59 USD in 2004) rose to an unknown amount. As the amount rose, contenders could buzz in and take the money – the first contender to press their buzzer received the current amount and left the game, which meant that their opponent proceeded to the show's endgame. If neither player buzzed in before the rising of the money stopped, they move on to the second part where the two competitors receive a calculation. If one contender buzzed in with the correct result, they won and advanced to the endgame. If a player buzzed in with the incorrect answer, the opponent moved on to the endgame (for the rules of the endgame, see below).

Three times during the game (after round 4, 5 and 6), the remaining contenders were given the chance to leave the game with a valuable prize. (The value of the prize was increased round by round – starting with FL. 10,000 in the first bonus round, followed by a long-distance trip in Round 2 and climaxing in Round 3 which offered a brand-new BMW luxury car) They were given a secret amount of seconds (indicated by a giant neon bulb at the center of the Temptation Table) to press their buzzer – the first one to do so was given the prize and left the game. He was then replaced by an audience member selected by the Random Remote of Doom (see below). If none of the contenders decided to leave the game, the Random Remote of Doom picked out an audience member to win the prize instead.

In 2002, the format of Miljoenenjacht was changed and the "Deal or no Deal" final round was introduced. These are the new rules used for the show from 2002 on.

=== Settings ===
Five hundred contestants (plus one friend or family member for each of them, so 1,000 audience members in total) are seated in an arena-style set. The contestant audience is divided into two sections of 250 contenders each, one red and one blue. Each section is then divided into five sections of 50 players each. The five red blocks are numbered 1 to 5 and the blue blocks are numbered 6 to 10. These blocks of 50 are further divided into two blocks of 25, labeled A (the lower half of the section) and B (the upper half) respectively.

=== Preliminary rounds ===
In the first round, the host asks the contestants a multiple-choice question with three possible answers, which they have 5 seconds to answer using their keypads. Each correct answer gains their team of 250 (red or blue) a point, with a wrong answer being worth nothing. Points are announced after each question and the team with the most points after three questions (from 2002 to 2003: four questions) advances to round two. The other team of 250 is out of the game. (Starting in 2008, everyone on the winning team receives a small prize valued at about €100.)

In round two, the five blocks of 50 compete against each other in the same fashion as above, with the winning group proceeding.

Finally, round three sees the two blocks of 25 battle each other, with the winning half continuing to the next round.

After each of those three rounds, there may be the possibility of an additional question if two or more teams are tied, with only the tied teams contending. If the tie can not be broken, the speed of the players locking in their correct answers will decide which group will proceed.

In 2009, after each round, one player from the losing section was randomly chosen and given the option of taking home a valuable prize or taking a seat in Round 4. If the contestant took the seat in Round 4, the prize rolled over to the next round, so after Round 3 a contestant could have gone home with about €15,000 in prizes.

Starting in 2010, after each round, one eliminated player is randomly selected and given the opportunity to pick one of three colored briefcases (red, white or blue). Two of them have a valuable prize inside. If one of these is chosen then everyone in that block of 25 wins that prize. The other case contains a "Chance to win € 5 million" sign and, if this case is picked, the contestant then takes a seat in Round 4.

=== Round 4 ===
Six different variations of Round 4 have existed during the show's current run.

==== Variation used from 2002 to 2003 ====
The twenty-five players from the winning block in Round 3 proceed to the next round where they are joined by another contender selected completely at random from the remaining 475 players. Originally, the fourth round consisted of two parts. In the first part, the contenders had to answer seven multiple-choice questions, each one with two possible answers. They had five seconds to answer each of the questions and, in case of a correct answer, received one point for each incorrect answer from their opponents (e.g. if 11 contenders answered correctly and 15 gave a wrong answer, the 11 players with the right answer received 15 points each). After seven questions, the names of the 10 best players were announced. These contenders moved on to the second part of the game. In this second part, the rules were equal to those in the first part, but now there were four possible answers for each question instead of two. After the second part of the game, the two highest scorers moved on to the final quiz round, Round 5.

==== Variation used until 2005 ====
The 25 players in the winning block proceed to the next round where they will be joined by another player selected at random (see "Random Remote of Doom") after Round 3. The randomly-chosen player gets the opportunity to choose between a valuable prize and a seat in Round 4 – the prize he rejects (either the got-off premium or the ticket for the next round) will be given away to another randomly-selected audience member. The final 26 players then are placed on podiums in the middle of the set where they will be asked 10 questions – the first three have two possible answers, the next three questions have three, and the final four questions have four. All players key in their answers. If a player answers correctly, they receive one point for each contestant who answered incorrectly. All players who choose a wrong answer receive nothing. The two highest scorers at the end of the round move on to the final quiz round, Round 5. There has also been a slight variation of this 26-player round where the contestants had to answer only six questions, with the first three questions having two possible answers and the last three questions having four options. Again, players who answered correctly scored one point for each incorrect answer of their opponents, and the two highest scorers advance to the final quiz round. (In a further variation of that round used in 2003, the players had to answer eight questions – the first four questions having two possible answers and the last four questions having four options each)

==== Variation used in 2005 and 2006 ====
Starting in 2005, the five best players from the winning block plus one randomly selected audience member take their place at one of six podiums. The host Linda de Mol gives the players a series of clues one at a time that pertain to a certain person, place, or object. If a player buzzes in and is incorrect, they will leave the game. If a player buzzes in and is correct, however, that person must select an opponent to eliminate from the game by pressing one of five buttons on their podium. However, the player who is about to be eliminated still has a chance to win some money. If they feel they have been chosen to be eliminated, they can press their buzzer. The first person that does chooses a coloured suitcase. These contain amounts from €1,000 to €22,000. Whatever is in the case is what that player wins, however, they must then leave the game. If no-one chooses to take the bribe, the player who was selected to be eliminated leaves without any money. The game continues until two remain.

==== Variation used in 2007 and 2008 ====
The five best players from the winning block plus one randomly selected audience member take their place at one of six podiums. Linda then asks the players questions. The players type in their answers to these questions, which are always numbers. The one whose answer is furthest away from the correct answer gets eliminated. However, like in the variation used in 2005 and 2006, the player who is about to be eliminated still has a chance to win some money. Before Linda reveals the answer, they are given a chance to press their buzzer and bail out of the game. This person can then choose between four coloured suitcases (red, blue, green, orange). The four suitcases together contain €40,000. Whatever is in the case is what that player wins, however, they must then leave the game. If no-one chooses to take the bribe, the player whose answer was furthest away leaves without any money. The game continues until two remain.

==== Variation used in 2008 ====
Just like in the previous variation, the five best players and a randomly selected audience member take place at one of six podiums and answer four questions, to which the answers are always numbers. The only difference is that the players have no possibility to press their buzzer and choose one of the suitcases. Instead of this the player whose answer is furthest away from the correct answer wins a small sum of money (€1000 for the first eliminated, €2000 for the second, €3000 for the third and €4000 for the fourth).

==== Variation used from 2009 onward ====
As in the previous two variations, the six players—those who turned down prizes from the previous rounds, plus the best players in the quiz—will answer questions with numerical answers. Now, however, questions are based on audience polls. Linda will ask a yes-or-no question to either the entire studio audience or a particular group (men, women, married men, married women, etc.) and once everyone has entered their answer, she will ask the players to guess how many people answered affirmatively. Whoever is furthest away from the actual number is eliminated, but will win a sum of money as stated above.

=== Round 5 ===
The two remaining contestants face each other at a single showdown-style podium (the Temptation Table), with one buzzer for each contender and a neon bulb in the center. A spinning mystery suitcase is placed on the set's stairs. The contents can be given to one of the players if they eliminate themselves from the game, therefore giving the other player a chance to win from €0.01 to €5,000,000. Its contents can include expenses-paid trips, cars, and a variety of other prizes. If no-one chooses to take the contents of the suitcase, which they will not know until it is open, the two contenders had to play another short quiz round. From 2003 until 2004, Linda would ask the players a simple math question. The first player to buzz in and provide the right answer proceeds to the final round. A player who buzzes in with an incorrect answer gets eliminated and his opponent moves on to the final game.

In later shows, Linda asks one more multiple-choice question with three possible answers. (In fact, the question given was an estimated guess question with three possible guesses proposed, the best guess had to be selected). If a player buzzes in and answers correct, that player wins the game and moves on to the final round. If a player buzzes in and answers incorrectly, the other player may answer with one of the two remaining choices. If both are wrong, the player who buzzed in first proceeds, and the other is eliminated.

During the first 2008 series, however, the mysterious suitcase was no longer the prize one of the two players left could take. Starting from €0 (later €1,000 see below), the amount of money awarded to a player who eliminates themselves rises up to a certain amount, chosen beforehand, after which the players cannot eliminate themselves freely anymore. If a player buzzes before the money rise has ended, the player will receive the amount of money it had risen to up to that point. If no player eliminates themselves, the contestants will receive a calculation, which they will have to answer correctly to proceed to the final round. If an incorrect answer is given, the other contestant will proceed to the final round.

== Final round ==
=== Variation used until 2002 ===
The original final round of Miljoenenjacht was based on the final round of the German game show format "Die Chance deines Lebens" ("The Chance of Your Life"): The winning player is sitting in a red armchair which is situated on a platform rising towards the ceiling as the final game begins. (S)he will be guaranteed at least ƒ1, but can turn it into ƒ10,000,000. To do so, Linda will ask seven back-to-back multiple-choice questions, each one with seven possible answers of which only one is correct. The player attempts to answer each of the questions within 30 seconds. For each question the contestant answers correctly, their winnings will be multiplied by a factor of 10. After answering all seven questions, the platform is lowered again. Linda joins the player on stage and the finalist gets notified which and how many questions they got right and their total winnings.

The ladder for the amount of winnings is as follows:

Questions answered correctly	Amount of money won
0	ƒ1 (€0.45)
1	ƒ10 (€4.54)
2	ƒ100 (€45.38)
3	ƒ1,000 (€453.78)
4	ƒ10,000 (€4,537.80)
5	ƒ100,000 (€45,378)
6	ƒ1,000,000 (€453,780)
7	ƒ10,000,000 (€4,537,800)

On September 2, 2001, a special edition of the final game was carried out in order to close out the first series of Miljoenenjacht. In this new setup, two contenders could qualify for the final game. These two competitors were asked questions of general knowledge, each one with seven possible answers, and each player had to key in an answer. The answer of the fastest competitor was shown; if he was right, he would score a point and his competitor would receive nothing regardless of his answer. If the fastest player answered incorrectly, his opponent would receive a point regardless of his answer. The first competitor to score seven points would receive 10 million guilders.

=== Variation used from 2002 onward ===
On December 22, 2002, the format of the final round was changed and the show first introduced the format known in many countries as Deal or No Deal. The final player faces 26 sealed golden briefcases, numbered 1 to 26 and containing hidden cheque of certain amounts of money. At this point, neither the host nor the contenders, as well as the producers, know which amount is sealed in which case. The player now has to select one of the 26 cases to keep in his possession for as long as possible. After the selection, the players have a brief talk with the show's independent adjudicator responsible for loading the various cash amounts into the cases. Linda and the qualified contestant then make their way to the middle of the stage (where the quiz portion had earlier taken place, but with the podiums moved). The other contestants from the winning section in round 3, plus the randomly selected person for round 4 (or without this person if it had been the winning contestant in round 5), are each given a different suitcase from the 25 remaining ones. They are seated in a special section of the set in the order of their case numbers. The winning player chooses cases to be opened, however if they open a case, they will no longer be able to win that amount of money (unless they accept it in a deal, see below). Each round calls for the contestant to eliminate a set number of cases:

Six cases are removed in the first round, each round removing one less case, and after 6 rounds of offers, the cases are opened one at a time.

The player selects a case, and the eliminated player holding it guesses which value from the remaining ones on board it contains. If they are correct, the player wins €1,000 for each unopened case at the moment of guessing, so if the first selected panel member guesses correctly, they win €26,000. After the selected number of cases for the round are opened, an alarm sounds, and a bank offer is placed on the screen using an on-screen graphic. The offer corresponds with what round it is, what is left on the board, the luck and emotions of the player, how many cases are left on the set, and probability of removing a giant amount. The longer the large values remain on the board, the higher the offer will be. The player in this bonus round has a friend sitting on the set (much like the Who Wants to Be a Millionaire? companion seat) to help with the decision. During the first seasons aired from 2002 on, the contenders were even able to ask the audience about taking or refusing the bank offer. Similar to the Who Wants to Be a Millionaire? lifeline "Ask the Audience", the audience members used keypads to key in their decision within five seconds – the result of the voting was shown in percentage terms. Once seeing the offer and considering it, the player either says "Deal", in which case the player sells their briefcase for the bank offer, or "No Deal", in which case the player opens the next round's number of cases, before the next offer. Play continues until the player says "Deal" or until all cases are opened, and in this situation, the player leaves with their briefcase's contents. A random at-home viewer will also be given the same amount of money as the contestant's win.

Fall 2002 – Spring 2006

Case values
€0.01	€7,500
€0.20	€10,000
€0.50	€25,000
€1	€50,000
€5	€75,000
€10	€100,000
€20	€200,000
€50	€300,000
€100	€400,000
€500	€500,000
€1,000	€1,000,000
€2,500	€2,500,000
€5,000	€5,000,000
Sum: €10,176,686.71

Fall 2006 – Spring 2012

Case values
€0.01	€10,000
€0.20	€25,000
€0.50	€50,000
€1	€75,000
€5	€100,000
€10	€200,000
€20	€300,000
€50	€400,000
€100	€500,000
€500	€750,000
€1,000	€1,000,000
€2,500	€2,500,000
€5,000	€5,000,000
Sum: €10,919,186.71

Fall 2012 – Fall 2016

Case values
€0.01	€10,000
€0.20	€20,000
€0.50	€30,000
€1	€40,000
€5	€50,000
€10	€100,000
€20	€250,000
€50	€500,000
€100	€750,000
€500	€1,000,000
€1,000	€2,000,000
€2,500	€2,500,000
€5,000	€5,000,000
Sum: €12,259,186.71

Spring 2017

Case values
€0.01	€10,000
€0.20	€50,000
€0.50	€100,000
€1	€200,000
€5	€300,000
€10	€400,000
€20	€500,000
€50	€600,000
€100	€750,000
€500	€1,000,000
€1,000	€2,000,000
€2,500	€2,500,000
€5,000	€5,000,000
Sum: €13,419,186.71

Fall 2017 – present

Case values
€0.01	€10,000
€0.20	€25,000
€0.50	€50,000
€1	€100,000
€5	€200,000
€10	€300,000
€20	€400,000
€50	€500,000
€100	€750,000
€500	€1,000,000
€1,000	€2,000,000
€2,500	€2,500,000
€5,000	€5,000,000
Sum: €12,844,186.71

April 13, 2025 (Note: 25th anniversary special.)

Case values
€0.01	€10,000
€0.20	€25,000
€0.50	€50,000
€1	€100,000
€5	€200,000
€10	€300,000
€20	€400,000
€50	€500,000
€100	€750,000
€500	€1,000,000
€1,000	€2,000,000
€2,500	€2,500,000
€5,000	€10,000,000
Sum: €17,844,186.71

== Random Remote of Doom ==
An item of the show known to fans as the "Random Remote of Doom" has almost become a trademark of the show. Sometimes, Linda has the remote in her hand, which seemingly appears from nowhere. She presses one of its buttons, a red light flashes on it, and someone from the audience is selected randomly – in fact, as this is common use in game shows, the contenders chosen have been predetermined before the taping of the show by an independent adjudicator who randomly ascertains the players. The announcement of the appropriate players – accompanied by various light effects – is presented by firstly "selecting" one of the 10 audience sections. After that, one of the two blocks (prior to 2002: five blocks) of that section gets chosen. Finally, a seat number from that block gets selected, the person sitting on this seat is the contestant which gets awarded whatever is on the line. This might be a cash prize or the opportunity to join the game as an additional contender. Sometimes, if neither contestant playing Round 5 eliminated themselves from the game to accept the prize in the mystery suitcase, Linda activates the remote, with an audience member winning that very prize instead.

The Random Remote of Doom was first introduced in the German original version "Die Chance deines Lebens" in April 2000 and also became an important part of the Dutch version. It has been used from the beginning of the show in late 2000 until 2010 when the production moved from the former Endemol studios in Aalsmeer to the new Endemol headquarters in Amsterdam.

== Temptation Table ==
Another permanent feature of the show is the so-called "Temptation Table", a round futuristic table with a giant neon bulb in its center. Ten buzzers are situated at the edge of the table, and lightning stripes visible through the transparent tabletop lead from the buzzers to the central neon bulb which can be illuminated in various colours. After Round 4 of the original show aired from 2000 onwards, the ten victorious players gathered around the table, with each player standing behind one of the buzzers. After Linda presented the prize which the contenders can gain for bailing out, the neon bulb, which had been illuminated in red colour up to that point, turned green for 10 seconds – as long as the bulb was green, players could hit their buzzer to quit the game. The first one to hit his buzzer automatically switched on the lightning stripe leading from the appropriate buzzer to the bulb which indicated the winner. If no-one bails out within the countdown of 10 seconds, the bulb turns red again. The table was used for the bailout rounds after the fourth, fifth and sixth quiz round, as well as for the semi-final.

When the "Deal or No Deal" format was introduced in 2002, the fifth and final quiz round saw only two players facing off at the Temptation Table. After the production moved from the TROS to Talpa, the eight unused buzzers were removed from the table's edge, leaving only two buzzers opposite of each other (one for each semi-finalist). Even when the production moved from Aalsmeer to the MediArena studios in Amsterdam in 2010 and the entire design of the show was changed, the Temptation Table still kept its look, only to be replaced by a more futuristic model in 2016.

== Extreme prizes (theoretical and factual) ==
Every show Miljoenenjacht can, theoretically, give away more than three times the jackpot of the case game, €5,000,000. This happens when:

- The in-studio player has the opportunity to win €5,000,000 in the case game.
- A random at-home viewer, who plays in the Postcode Loterij, and has selected the same "number" as the briefcase chosen by the end game player, is given an amount equal to what the in-studio player wins, which could also be €5,000,000.
- When a player selects their briefcase in the final round, that person states their postcode. The following week, whatever the in-studio player wins, that person's postcode dwellers win a portion of the top prize too. When all values are given away to each person in the postcode, it totals up to €5,000,000.
- If all the briefcase holders correctly guess the amounts in their briefcases (see Final Round section), a further €350,000 will be given away.
- In round four, if all of the four contestants chosen to be eliminated take the bribe, a further amount of money will be given away.

When all these amounts are summed, the total is €15,350,000 plus the money from the 'bribes', which is more than three times the top prize of €5,000,000.

Extreme winners:

- The show's most successful winner is Arno Woesthoff from Zeist. He won ƒ10,000,000 (€4,537,802) in the episode of September 2, 2001. In a previous episode of Miljoenenjacht he had already won ƒ1,000,000 (€453,780), for a grand total of ƒ11,000,000 (€4,991,582). With that, he holds the record for Dutch quiz show winnings, and has remained, to date, the biggest game show winner worldwide.
- The show's second-biggest winner is Helma. She won €1,495,000 (US$2,147,723 or £1,211,700) with the amounts of €1,000, €75,000, €2,500,000 and €5,000,000 remaining on the board. As per normal, she continued picking cases after she dealt, to see how much she would have won had she carried on. She removed the €5,000,000 on her next pick, thus ending up having a 'perfect' game. Her briefcase turned out to only have had €1,000. This was reportedly one of the biggest wins in worldwide traditional game show history.
- The show's third-biggest winner is Krijn Schouten from Almere. He won €1,120,000 (US$1,321,208 or £978,178) in the episode of October 1, 2017. The five amounts which remained on the board were €5, €750,000, €1,000,000, €2,500,000 and €5,000,000. He would have removed the €5 in the next case. His briefcase turned out to contain €1,000,000. He asked his wife if she wanted to marry him after the game.
- The show's smallest winner is Frank, a man from Venlo who won €10 on January 1, 2005, after rejecting €6,000 with €10,000 being the other amount in play.
- The show's biggest loss of a deal occurred on November 3, 2013, when Arrold van den Hurk unintentionally pressed the red button and thus made a deal of €125,000. His case turned out to have the top prize in it. A male contestant on June 1, 2008, a female contestant on April 4, 2010, male contestant on November 21, 2010, and a male contestant on October 15, 2022, accepted €1,050,000, €1,000,000, €460,000, and €449,000 respectively for their cases, which also had the top prize.

== Fall 2010 changes ==
=== Quiz Round ===
The 500 players (and their respective partners, that means 1,000 audience members in total) are divided into 10 sections of 50 contenders each, each from a pre-selected postal code. Linda asks 5 multiple-choice questions, each with 3 possible answers. (The third question is accompanied by a video related to the subject of that question.) Players have 6 seconds to enter their answers via keypad. The player in each section who answers the most questions correctly in the fastest time moves on to Round 2; the remaining players in each section receive a consolation prize, such as a digital video camera. In 2013, this round has been completely rearranged – the 500 players have to answer estimated guess questions by typing in a number as close as possible to the correct figure using their keypads. The contestant with the best answer gets chosen after each question and now has to decide whether going through to the next round or selecting one of five briefcases on the set's stairs. The cases contain valuable prizes, starting from 500 euro in cash going up to a brand-new car. If the contestant chooses to proceed, he nevertheless has to select one of the cases, the content of which get awarded to a randomly selected audience member. If the contestant selects to take the prize, another audience player selected randomly goes through to the next round instead. Five questions get asked in this round – as a result, five contestants proceed to the next game.

=== Round 2 ===
The ten winners from the Quiz Round are then paired into a series of 5 one-on-one matchups, with Linda polling the studio audience, or certain members of that audience, on a particular question for each matchup. After the audience members electronically answer "yes" or "no", the contestants, using keypads, will guess how many of the audience members answered "yes". The player closest to the actual number moves on to Round 3. Guessing the number exactly wins a brand-new car. In 2013, this round has been eliminated – after the new first round, the game directly proceeds with what has been the third round before.

=== Round 3 ===
(Round 2 from 2013 on) The five winners from the previous round play another question round, placed 1st through 5th, based on how well they did in the first 2 rounds. Linda asks a series of general-knowledge questions for players to buzz in and answer. A correct answer moves a player up one place [i.e., from 2nd to 1st], while an incorrect answer moves a player down one place [i.e., from 1st to 2nd]. A player in last place who answers incorrectly is blocked from answering the next question. After 100 seconds (later 90), the 5th place player is eliminated and wins €1,000. The process is then repeated for two more rounds, with the 4th place contestant winning €2,000 and the 3rd place contestant winning €3,000.

=== Round 4 ===
The last two contestants from Round 3 faced each other at the Temptation Table and are shown a jackpot starting at €1,000 and increasing irregularly up to a predetermined amount. Whoever buzzes in first takes whatever money is shown on the counter while the other player goes on to the Final Round. If no one buzzes in when the predetermined amount is reached, Linda asks a math question, with the first to buzz in and answer correctly advancing to that Final Round.

=== Final Round ===
The final round is played as before, but instead of audience members holding the briefcases and guessing how much theirs is worth, the models are holding the cases, as in the US and Philippine versions of Deal or No Deal. Prior to this round, a randomly selected audience member is given a handbell to ring, during the first two briefcase-picking rounds, if that audience member thinks a briefcase chosen by the contestant has a lot of money. If the briefcase holds €50,000 or more, the audience member wins €50,000, but anything less, and the audience member wins that amount. (In 2017, the handbell game has significantly changed – now, the selected audience member can choose one of the 26 briefcases at the beginning of the final and then receives a "mini-suitcase" with the same number, containing an amount of money according to the amount in the original case. Like in the handbell game, the audience player receives the same amount of money as hidden in the original case if it is less than €50,000. If the case contains more than €50,000, the bonus player wins €50,000. If the selected case contains the 5 million, the bonus player wins €100,000.

Whatever each contestant wins is also won by a randomly selected viewer and also divided amongst lottery players in the winner's postal code.

=== Random Remote of Doom variation ===
A couple of times in each episode, audience members are randomly selected to win a cash prize, such as €10,000. To do so, first one of the ten postcode sections is selected at random before one of the fifty players of this section is selected by announcing their name (instead of their seat number as in the previous shows of Miljoenenjacht). In some cases, the entire section (all 50 players) selected wins a small prize while the selected contender wins an additional €10,000 cash prize. For this new selection process, Linda does not use her Random Remote of Doom anymore. As of 2014, only viewers can win €10,000 by calling in or texting.
