= Deal or No Deal (disambiguation) =

Deal or No Deal is the name of several closely related television game shows, including:

- Deal or No Deal (Arab world)
- Deal or No Deal (Argentina)
- Deal or No Deal (Australian game show)
- Deal or No Deal (Bulgaria)
- Deal or No Deal (Chile)
- Deal or No Deal (Denmark)
- Deal Ya No Deal (India)
- Deal or No Deal (Ireland)
- Deal or No Deal (Germany)
- Deal or No Deal (Hong Kong)
- Deal or No Deal (Israel)
- Deal or No Deal (Maltese game show)
- Deal or No Deal (Netherlands)
- Deal or No Deal (New Zealand)
- Deal or No Deal (Norway)
- Kapamilya, Deal or No Deal (Philippines)
- Deal or No Deal (Poland)
- Deal or No Deal (Singapore)
- Deal or No Deal (Slovenia)
- Deal or No Deal (South Africa)
- Deal or No Deal (Spain)
- Deal or No Deal (Sweden)
- Deal or No Deal (Thailand)
- Deal or No Deal (Tunisia)
- Deal or No Deal (British game show)
- Deal or No Deal (American game show), the NBC primetime version
- Deal or No Deal (American syndicated game show), the NBC syndicated version

Deal or No Deal may also refer to:

- "Deal or No Deal" (Prison Break), an episode of the television series Prison Break
- Deal or No Deal (video game), based on the television show
- Deal or No Deal (album), a 2009 album by Wiz Khalifa
- "Deal or No Deal", a song by Mabel from About Last Night..., 2022
