= Var mısın? Yok musun? =

Turkish game show

- Also known as: İlker Ayrık'la Var mısınız? Yok musunuz? (2016)
- Created by: Dick de Rijk; John de Mol Jr
- Presented by: Acun Ilıcalı (2007-10); Asuman Krause (2011-12); Ahmet Çakar (2013); İlker Ayrık (İlker Ayrık'la Var mısınız? Yok musunuz?, 2016); Esra Erol (2026-)
- Country of origin: Turkey
- No. of episodes: Approximately 500

Production
- Running time: 50 minutes (with commercials)

Original release
- Network: Show TV
- Release: 10 September 2007 – 16 September 2010
- Network: Fox
- Release: 8 November 2011 – 29 March 2012
- Network: Show TV
- Release: 11 September 2013 – 2013
- Network: Star TV
- Release: 25 June – 5 November 2016
- Network: ATV
- Release: 28 May 2026 – present

Var mısın? Yok musun? is a Turkish adaptation of the game show Deal or No Deal. Produced by Acun Ilıcalı for Show TV, the show originally aired between 10 September 2007 and 16 September 2010. From 2007 to 31 October 2009, 350 episodes aired.

There were 24 boxes containing prizes from 1 TL to 500,000 TL. The set and board graphics were similar to the French version, but the theme music and the logo were similar to the US version. The offers were made by "Hamdi Bey", a fictitious character portrayed as a banker; although in February 2008 it was claimed that "Hamdi Bey" was in fact a studio assistant to one of Acun Ilıcalı's former shows, and his name was not Hamdi but Birol; but Acun Ilıcalı dismissed the claims.

A New Year's Eve special was aired on 31 December 2007. The set was nearly identical to the US version. There were 26 cases, all held by models, containing prizes from 1 TL to 1,000,000 TL and the player won 125,000 TL.

Although two different versions of Deal or No Deal had aired in Turkish TV's before and none had been successful, this version of the show was a hit from the first day it was broadcast.

The show airs four or five times a week and receives good ratings, ranking from being first to third most watched TV show of the day.

Until March 2008, there was only one 500,000 TL box; but from that moment onwards two more 500,000 TL boxes were added to the show, tripling the chance to choose the grand prize box, and generally boosting the bank offers. In the 2008 season, one more box worth 500,000 TL was added, bringing the highest prize box count to 4.

In September 2009, producer Acun Ilıcalı set his mind to make at least one person win the grand prize, hence raising the number of 500,000 TL boxes to 10. Consequently, Ülkühan Yılmaz won the grand prize for the first time on 24 October 2009. He is currently the only person who has ever won the grand prize in Turkey.

The show had several guest contestants throughout its life, namely 50 Cent, Adriana Lima, Bruce Willis (together with Emma Heming), Christina Aguilera, Paris Hilton and Roberto Carlos. Turkish celebrities like Cem Yılmaz and Fatih Terim (among with players of Turkish National Football Team of Euro 2008) have also appeared within the show.

The show started again on 8 November 2011 on Fox Canlı and was hosted by musician Asuman Krause. The format is identical to the Show TV version, but the number of boxes was reduced to 22.

In 2013, a short-lived revival was broadcast on Show TV, the network that aired the original version, again with 22 boxes and the same board as the Fox version. This version was hosted by sportscaster and football referee Ahmet Çakar.

Another version, under the title of İlker Ayrık'la Var mısınız? Yok musunuz? was aired on Star TV from 25 June to 5 November 2016, hosted by comedy actor and TV presenter İlker Ayrık. This version also had 22 boxes, but at the beginning of the game there was only one box containing 500,000 TL (now time shown with the Turkish lira sign ₺) like most other versions except the 2019-20 Mexican version, however rather uniquely, in this version contestants could choose to play a minigame (usually achieve an all-blue round) to replace the next-highest amount on the board with the top prize amount. The 1 TL amount could also be worth a car. This version was noticeably longer, running for 2 hours, and had more of an over-the-top feeling with contestants performing stunts and staged comedy being more commonplace.

In 2026, ATV announced that a revival (under the original name) would air hosted by talk show host Esra Erol from 28 May, with the top prize increased to ₺5,000,000. The new logo appears to resemble the Spanish version's 2023 logo, while the set is similar to that of the 2023 British version (which was shown in early promotional material), and the boxes are the same as those from the 2014 German version, marking a potential shift in the show's audiovisual presentation, especially given that none of the trailers used the US soundtrack. This version premiered on 28 May 2026, once again with 22 boxes and, like the 2011 and 2013 versions, with two boxes containing the top-prize amount.

== Box values ==
=== September 2007 to March 2008 ===
1 YTL
2 YTL
5 YTL
10 YTL
25 YTL
50 YTL
100 YTL
200 YTL
300 YTL
400 YTL
500 YTL
750 YTL

1,000 YTL
5,000 YTL
10,000 YTL
15,000 YTL
25,000 YTL
50,000 YTL
75,000 YTL
100,000 YTL
125,000 YTL
150,000 YTL
250,000 YTL
500,000 YTL

=== March 2008 to September 2008 ===
1 YTL
2 YTL
5 YTL
10 YTL
25 YTL
50 YTL
100 YTL
200 YTL
300 YTL
400 YTL
500 YTL
750 YTL

1,000 YTL
5,000 YTL
10,000 YTL
15,000 YTL
25,000 YTL
50,000 YTL
75,000 YTL
100,000 YTL
125,000 YTL
500,000 YTL
500,000 YTL
500,000 YTL

=== September 2008 to early 2009 ===
1 TL
2 TL
5 TL
10 TL
25 TL
50 TL
100 TL
200 TL
300 TL
400 TL
500 TL
750 TL

20,000 TL
30,000 TL
40,000 TL
50,000 TL
100,000 TL
150,000 TL
200,000 TL
250,000 TL
500,000 TL
500,000 TL
500,000 TL
500,000 TL

=== Late 2009 and 2010 ===
1 TL
2 TL
5 TL
10 TL
25 TL
50 TL
100 TL
200 TL
300 TL
400 TL
500 TL
750 TL

10,000 TL
20,000 TL
30,000 TL
40,000 TL
50,000 TL
100,000 TL
150,000 TL
500,000 TL
500,000 TL
500,000 TL
500,000 TL
500,000 TL

=== 2011-13 ===
1 TL
2 TL
5 TL
10 TL
25 TL
50 TL
100 TL
200 TL
300 TL
400 TL
500 TL

5,000 TL
10,000 TL
15,000 TL
25,000 TL
50,000 TL
75,000 TL
100,000 TL
150,000 TL
250,000 TL
500,000 TL
500,000 TL

=== 2026- ===
₺1
₺5
₺10
₺25
₺50
₺100
₺250
₺500
₺1,000
₺5,000
₺10,000

₺25,000
₺50,000
₺100,000
₺250,000
₺500,000
₺750,000
₺1,000,000
₺2,000,000
₺3,000,000
₺5,000,000
₺5,000,000

=== "İlker Ayrık'la Var mısınız? Yok musunuz?" (2016) ===
==== Episodes 1 - 13 ====
₺1 or Car
₺5
₺10
₺25
₺50
₺75
₺100
₺200
₺300
₺400
₺500
₺750

₺1,000
₺2,500
₺5,000
₺7,500
₺10,000
₺25,000
₺50,000
₺75,000
₺100,000
₺150,000
₺250,000
₺500,000

==== Episodes 14 - 35 ====
₺1 or Car
₺5
₺10
₺25
₺50
₺100
₺200
₺300
₺400
₺500
₺750

₺1,000
₺2,500
₺5,000
₺10,000
₺25,000
₺50,000
₺75,000
₺100,000
₺150,000
₺250,000
₺500,000

=== 31 December 2007 special ===
1 TL
2 TL
5 TL
10 TL
25 TL
50 TL
75 TL
100 TL
200 TL
300 TL
400 TL
500 TL
750 TL

1,000 TL
2,500 TL
5,000 TL
10,000 TL
15,000 TL
25,000 TL
50,000 TL
75,000 TL
100,000 TL
125,000 TL
250,000 TL
500,000 TL
1,000,000 TL

=== Survivor All Star ===
100
250
500
750
1,000
2,500
5,000

10,000
50,000
100,000
150,000
250,000
500,000
500,000

== Special Guests (Chronologically) ==
- Christina Aguilera - 19 October 2008 - earned 180,000 TL for the Bolluca Children's Village project of the Turkish Foundation for Children in Need of Protection.
- 50 Cent - 20 December 2008 - earned 30,000 TL for covering the album expenses of Ramiz, a young rapper from Turkey
- Adriana Lima - 25 January 2009 - earned 75,000 TL and donated her earnings to a Turkish institute for children with cancer.
- Roberto Carlos - 4 April 2009 - earned 40,000 TL for charity.
- Paris Hilton - 31 May 2009 - earned 50,000 TL for charity.
- Bruce Willis and Emma Heming - 31 October 2009 - earned 100,000 TL for the charity Bir Dilek Tut ("Make a Wish").
- Alessandra Ambrosio - 31 August 2010 - earned 75.000 TL for covering the surgery expenses of a young Turkish girl who had burned her face accidentally.
