= Asuman Krause =

Turkish musical artist

- Born: 1 March 1976 (age 49) in West Berlin, West Germany
- Origin: German and Turkish of Circassian descent
- Genres: Turkish pop
- Occupation(s): Singer, presenter, model, actress
- Instrument: Vocals
- Years active: 1998–present
- Labels: Seyhan Müzik (2006–08)

Asuman Krause (born 1 March 1976) is a Turkish actress, singer, model and TV host and beauty pageant titleholder of Circassian origin who was crowned Miss Turkey 1998 and represented her country at Miss Universe 1998.

== Early life and career ==
Born to a Circassian mother and a German father in West Germany, Krause played for the Germany national youth basketball team. Afterwards she decided to stay with her mother in Turkey. She then became a model and in March 1998 she won the Miss Turkey beauty pageant and went on to represent Turkey at Miss Universe, winning the Congeniality award. In the early 2000s, she was one of the most famous models in Turkey.

Giving up her modelling career in favour of a career as a singer in 2006, she released her debut album, Çok Yalnızım (English: I'm very lonely), with the Turkish record company Seyhan Müzik. It received some radio airplay and was compared with the likes of Burcu Güneş and Emel Müftüoğlu.

She released her second album, Kukla (English: Puppet), this time with another record company, Üçüncügöz Müzik, in 2008. This was met with more success than her previous album, and the first single from that album, also called "Kukla" reached the 10th position on the Turkish Billboard charts.

She hosted the Turkish versions of Wipeout, Fear Factor, Deal or No Deal (Var mısın? Yok musun?), Big Brother Türkiye and Family Feud.

== Discography ==
=== Albums ===
- Çok Yalnızım (I'm so lonely) (2006, Ozyurt Müzik)
- Kukla (Puppet) (2008, Erol Köse Prodüksiyon)

=== Singles ===
| Year | Song | Billboard Türkçe Top 20 |
|---|---|---|
| 2006 | "Tenimizin Uyumu" | N/A |
| 2008 | "Kukla" | 10 |
