= Jesús Vázquez (television presenter) =

Spanish television presenter (born 1965)

- Born: Jesús Vázquez Martínez; 9 September 1965 (age 61); Ferrol, Galicia, Spain
- Occupations: Television presenter, model
- Employer(s): Telecinco (1994–2025); RTVE (2025–present)
- Spouse: Roberto Cortés (m. 2005)
- Website: http://www.jesusvazquez.es/

Jesús Vázquez Martínez (born 9 September 1965) is a Spanish television presenter. In 2008, he became the first Spaniard to be selected as a Goodwill Ambassador for the UN Refugee Agency.

== Biography ==
Vázquez was born in Ferrol, Galicia. He began studies in Veterinary; however, before he could complete his studies he moved to Madrid. In this period, he worked as a model.

Vázquez rose to fame in the early 1990s as the host of two television shows aimed at the teenage audience aired on Telecinco: La quinta marcha (1990-1991), which he hosted alongside Penélope Cruz, and Hablando se entiende la basca (1991-1993). In this period, he starred in the film Aquí el que no corre, vuela. (1992), directed by Ramón Fernández and produced by Telecinco, along with Alfredo Landa, Arturo Fernández, Arantxa del Sol and Natalia Estrada. In 1993, he ventured into singing with the album A dos milímetros escasos de tu boca, which achieved a Gold Record certificate; however, his music career did not have continuity.

In 1998, Vázquez presented A propósito, on Canal Sur and the game show with celebrities Gente con chispa, aired on regional televisions. In 2000, he hosted the short-lived late night show La central on Antena 3, cancelled due to poor ratings. In 2001, he was hired by Telemadrid to host talk show Ésta es mi gente. In 2002, he combined this work with presenting talent show Popstars: Todo por un sueño on Telecinco.

In 2003, Vázquez left Telemadrid to present talk show Nadie es perfecto on Telecinco; the show was cancelled after three weeks. In that same year, also on Telecinco, he presented the weekly debate show of Gran Hermano (Big Brother), as well as reality television series Hotel Glam and Vivo Cantando. In 2004 and 2005, Vázquez hosted the first two seasons of Gran Hermano VIP (Celebrity version of Big Brother). Subsequently, he hosted reality-show talent contest reality-show talent contest Operación Triunfo from 2005 to 2008, and the Spanish version of Survivor from 2006 to 2010. In addition, he presented the daily game show ¡Allá tú! (Spanish adaptation of Deal or No Deal) from 2004 to 2008.

Apart from Operación Triunfo and Survivor, in 2007, Vázquez hosted the reality show Nadie es perfecto, and in 2009, game shows Guerra de sesos alongside Almudena Cid, and Mi familia contra todos. In 2010, the last seasons Operación Triunfo and Survivor that featured Vázquez aired and he presented reality dating show I Love Escassi.

When Telecinco and Cuatro merged into Mediaset España in 2011, it was decided that Vázquez would become a visible face of Cuatro. In Cuatro, he hosted the game show Uno para ganar (Spanish adaptation of Minute to Win It) and the fourth season of the reality television game show Pekín Express.

In 2012, Vázquez moved back to Telecinco to host La Voz (Spanish version of The Voice). Since then, he has also hosted the talent shows La Voz Kids, Pequeños Gigantes, Levántate, Me lo dices o me lo cantas and Factor X.

In 2016, Vázquez joined Got Talent España on its first season as one of the four judges. In 2017, Vázquez hosted Proyecto Bullying, a docu-show that centered on school bullying that will air on Cuatro.

In 2025, he set a Guinness World Record as the presenter who has hosted the highest number of different television programmes in the Spanish language, with a total of 46.

On 5 December 2025, it was announced that Vázquez would host Benidorm Fest on TVE. It was notable for being his first piece of work away from the Mediaset España network, with whom he had been in a golden handcuffs contract, since the 1990s.

=== Personal life ===
In November 2005, Vázquez married Roberto Cortés.

== National career as a television presenter in Spain ==
- La quinta marcha (1990–1991) in Telecinco.
- Hablando se entiende la basca (1991–1993) in Telecinco.
- Xuxa Park with Xuxa Meneghel (1991-1992)
- Desde Palma con amor (1992) in Telecinco with Concha Velasco.
- La Ruleta de la Suerte (1993–1994) in Telecinco.
- Manos a la obra (1998) in Antena 3.
- Gente con chispa (1999–2000) in FORTA.
- De qué hablan las Mujeres (2000) Antena 3TV.
- La central (2000) in Antena 3.
- ¿De qué hablan las mujeres? (2000) in Antena 3.
- Ésta es mi gente (2001–2002) in Telemadrid.
- Popstars (2002) in Telecinco.
- Gran Hermano (2002–2003) in Telecinco.
- Hotel Glamour (2003) in Telecinco.
- Nadie es perfecto (2003) en Telecinco.
- Vivo cantando (2003) in Telecinco.
- Gran Hermano VIP: El desafío (2004–2005) in Telecinco.
- ¡Allá tú! in Telecinco (2004–2008) and Cuatro (2011).
- Operación Triunfo (2005–2006, 2008) in Telecinco.
- Supervivientes (2006–2010) in Telecinco.
- 100th episode of Yo soy Bea (2006) in Telecinco.
- Nadie es perfecto (2007) in Telecinco.
- Mi familia contra todos (2009) in Telecinco.
- I Love Escassi (2010) in Telecinco.
- La guillotina (2010) in Telecinco.
- Pekín Express (2011) in Cuatro.
- Uno para ganar (2011–2012) in Cuatro.
- La Voz (2012–2017) in Telecinco.
- ¡Mira quién salta! (2013-2014) in Telecinco
- La Voz Kids (2013–2018) in Telecinco.
- Pequeños gigantes (2014–present) in Telecinco.
- Levántate (2015–2016) in Telecinco.
- Got Talent España (2016) in Telecinco (as judge).
- Proyecto Bullying (2017) in Cuatro.
- Me lo dices o me lo cantas (2017) in Telecinco.
- Factor X (2018) in Telecinco.
- Bake Off España (2019) in Cuatro.
