= Yes or No =

Yes or No or Yes/No may refer to:

- Yes and no in English
- Yes/no question, a form of question which can normally be answered using a simple "yes" or "no"

== Film and TV ==
- Yes or No? (1920 film), an American silent film
- Yes or No? (1940 film), a Hungarian comedy film
- Yes or No (film), a 2010 Thai romantic film
- Yes or No (game show), a version of Deal or No Deal airing in South Korea
- Yes or No (TV series), (யெஸ் ஆர் நோ) a Tamil-language talent game show in India
- "Yes/No" (Glee)", an episode of Glee
- "Yes or No, Tsunade's answer" ("YESかNOか!ツナデの回答"), a season four episode of the anime series Naruto (see list of Naruto episodes)

== Music ==
- Yes, No, a 1988 album by T-Square
- "Yes or No" (The Go-Go's song), 1984
- "Yes/No" (Banky W. song), 2012
- "Yes or No" (Jungkook song), 2023
- "Yes (or No)", song by Bug Hunter, 2017
- "Yes or No", song by Black Eyed Peas from Masters of the Sun Vol. 1, 2018

== Other uses ==
- "Yes" or "No" the Guide to Better Decisions a book by Spencer Johnson

== See also ==
- Yes and no (disambiguation)
