= Esra Erol =

Esra Erol may refer to:

- Esra Erol (TV presenter) (born 1982), Turkish television presenter
- Esra Erol (footballer) (born 1985), Turkish footballer
