= Ganjina =

Afghan television gameshow

- Persian: گنجینه
- Created by: Dick de Ryk; John de Mol Jr.
- Presented by: Rahim Mehrzad (earlier); Mukhtar Lashkari (later)
- Country of origin: Afghanistan

Production
- Camera setup: Multiple-camera setup
- Running time: 30 minutes (with commercials)

Original release
- Network: Tolo TV
- Release: May 30, 2010 – May 14, 2013

Ganjina (Persian: گـنـجـیـنـه, literally "treasure") is the Afghan version of the television gameshow Deal or No Deal. It premiered on May 30, 2010 and is broadcast on Tolo TV. The show was first hosted by the Afghan actor Rahim Mehrzad (Persian: رحیم میرزاد) and later by Mukhtar Lashkari (Persian: مختار لشکری).

There are 20 boxes containing prizes from 1 Afghani to 1,000,000 Afghani (about US$12,800). There have been three top prize winners.

The last episode was aired on May 14, 2013. From May 15 to June 6, 2013 a rerun of notable episodes was aired, including celebrity editions and two of the top prize winning episodes. On June 8, 2013, the show was replaced by new game show 100 Sanya (Persian: ثانیه 100, literally "100 seconds"), an Afghan adaptation of Divided.

== Box Values ==
| Left Side | Right Side |
|---|---|
| Af. 10,000 | Af. 1 |
| Af. 20,000 | Af. 5 |
| Af. 30,000 | Af. 10 |
| Af. 40,000 | Af. 50 |
| Af. 50,000 | Af. 100 |
| Af. 100,000 | Af. 250 |
| Af. 200,000 | Af. 500 |
| Af. 300,000 | Af. 1,000 |
| Af. 500,000 | Af. 2,500 |
| Af. 1,000,000 | Af. 5,000 |
