= Deal or No Deal (New Zealand game show) =

New Zealand television series

- Deal or No Deal New Zealand logo
- Genre: Game show
- Based on: Deal or No Deal by John de Mol Jr.
- Presented by: Jeremy Corbett
- Country of origin: New Zealand
- No. of episodes: 30

Production
- Running time: 1 hour
- Production company: Endemol Southern Star

Original release
- Network: TV3
- Release: 6 June – 26 December 2007

Deal or No Deal is the New Zealand version of the international game show format Deal or No Deal. After Prime TV's success airing the Australian version of Deal or No Deal, in New Zealand, a local version was launched on TV3 on 6 June 2007. The show was hosted by radio comedian Jeremy Corbett and each show aired for one hour, on Wednesday nights, from 7:30pm to 8:30pm. The 26 cases ranged in value from $0.10 to $200,000.

== Gameplay ==
Before the game, a third party randomly places the possible winnings in the cases, which are distributed to 26 identically-dressed models who reveal the contents during the game. No one involved in the show's production, including the host, models, or even the executive producers, knows which amounts are in the cases. Unlike many international versions of the show, the briefcases in the New Zealand gallery are not distributed to audience members, similar to the US version, the Philippine version and other versions of the show. This is unlike the Australian version which airs on the Prime TV network.

After picking one of the cases, the contestant then selects 6 of the remaining 25 cases, revealed one at a time. Each figure appears in only one case, so any values revealed in this way are not in the contestant's case. This is followed by a "phone call" by "The Banker", a mysterious figure shown only in silhouette now revealed to be William J. Conway. He purportedly sits in a skybox (situated between the two audience sections) and makes an offer, via telephone, to Corbett (his voice is never heard, except by Corbett himself) to buy the contestant's case based primarily on the mean of the cash amounts still in play, but also on the stage of the game (early offers tend to be far lower than the mean, perhaps to goad the contestant into continuing play) as well as the player's psychology. The question "Deal or No Deal" is now asked by Corbett to the contestant.

If the contestant accepts the "Deal" (by pushing a stylized red button enclosed in a glass case), the game ends, and the value of the case that he or she chose at the beginning of the game is then revealed along with the whereabouts of the remaining prizes. Should the contestant refuse the offer (by stating "No deal" or closing the glass case), they must choose five of the remaining cases to eliminate from consideration. The Banker makes another offer, and play continues as before. The Banker's offer may be higher or lower than the previous offer (if a top prize is eliminated, generally the offer decreases; conversely, if only lower amounts are eliminated the offer increases significantly).

Subsequent rounds have the contestant withdrawing four, three, then two cases from play. If the contestant says No Deal, then gameplay continues. The list below explains how many cases must be opened for each round:

- Round 1: 6 cases to open
- Round 2: 5 cases to open
- Round 3: 4 cases to open
- Round 4: 3 cases to open
- Round 5: 2 cases to open
- Round 6–10: 1 case to open

Should the contestant continue to decline the Banker's offer after this point, they then eliminate one case each time (with an intervening offer from the Banker) until two cases are left. If the player rejects the final offer, the player wins whatever is in his or her chosen case. Unlike other international versions of the show, the contestant is not offered the opportunity to switch cases.

Each contestant has several supporters (usually three), who sit in a special section just off stage during the game. As the field of cases dwindles, one or more of the supporters are asked to consult with the contestant and help him/her make a decision.

After the contestant has selected a "Deal", the game continues and the contestant chooses cases as normal, to see if the decision made was correct. "No deal" instead of "Deal" is assumed, until the end of the game. This is done to determine if the decision made was correct.

The official rules as set by TV3 on their website: "The rules for Deal or No Deal are simple. Choose a briefcase. Then as each round progresses, you must either stay with your original briefcase choice or make a 'deal' with the bank to accept its cash offer in exchange for whatever dollar amount is in your chosen case. Once you decide to accept or decline the bank's offer, the decision is final. Contestants are encouraged to ask friends or family on the podium for advice; however, only the contestant's answer will be considered binding and final." The show had two fill-in hosts if Jeremy was away but weren't used. The show only had one season.

=== Supercase ===
On 4 July, the 5th episode of Deal or No Deal, filmed after the pilot episodes, the "Supercase" game was introduced. This game consists of the contestant gambling his/her winnings in order to receive the opportunity to play the Supercase. If the contestant agrees to this, he/she will walk away with whatever amount the Supercase contains. If he/she doesn't accept this offer, he/she will walk away with the amount they have already won.

=== Double or Nothing ===
Recently, there is a feature where if the contestant wanted to risk their winnings, two small suitcases (labeled I and II) were shown; one had the word "Double" inside, the other had "Nothing". On one occasion, after the contestant (a fan of the New Zealand National Rugby Team) won the lowest prize on the board (10c), DoN was offered, but instead of doubling ten cents to twenty cents, choosing the "Double" case won a trip to the World Cup in Paris. She gambled, and won the trip.

=== Board ===
$0.10	$1,000
$1	$2,000
$2	$3,000
$5	$4,000
$10	$5,000
$20	$7,500
$50	$10,000
$100	$15,000
$150	$20,000
$200	CAR
$250	$50,000
$500	$100,000
$750	$200,000

- (CAR (Suzuki SX4) valued at $30,000)

== Controversy ==
=== Dresses ===
The pilot episode of Deal or No Deal was followed up by several complaints from viewers. The complaints laid were about the dresses that the models were wearing and the amount of cleavage shown. The models, supposedly, had to tape their breasts to the insides of the dresses to prevent them from being exposed. These claims were dismissed and the producers defended the show saying that the viewers complaining were old-fashioned and conservative.

More recently various styles of dress have appeared on the show, with the original dresses making appearances from time to time.

=== Drug charges ===
On 17 June 2007 it was reported that Deal or No Deal model Millie Holmes had been arrested on four drugs charges including possession of a pipe and possession of methamphetamine. 19-year-old Holmes is the adopted daughter of one of New Zealand's most well known broadcasters, TVNZ's Paul Holmes. Millie Holmes appeared as a model in episode 2 of the show, and also holds case number 4 in the 'Lucky Case' game, but left the show after a supposed dispute with the show's producers.
