= Deal or No Deal (Thai game show) =

Thai television series

Deal or No Deal’s (Thai: เอาหรือไม่เอา) Thai version, which aired on Channel 3, has prizes ranging from ฿0.25 to ฿1,000,000 (about $29,000, €26,000, or £22,000).

== Rules ==
The show starts with the cases being distributed to the equal numbers of players. First, the players are given the chance to bail out of the game and share an amount of money hidden in a secret briefcase. The contenders have keypads they use to decide to accept or reject that deal. After that, the amount inside the case gets revealed and the leaving winners will be told their share (i.e. if three people decide to leave, and there is 15,000 baht in the case, the three players receive 5,000 baht each). A randomizer then selects one of the remaining players who will proceed to the main game, with the cases opened by models. Before the game, the player can decide whether to play with the case he or she got at the beginning of the preliminary round or to select another case for the main game.

== Case values ==
฿0.25
฿0.50
฿0.75
฿1
฿2
฿3
฿5
฿10
฿25
฿50
฿100
฿250
฿500

฿1,000
฿2,500
฿5,000
฿10,000
฿20,000
฿30,000
฿50,000
฿100,000
฿200,000
฿300,000
฿400,000
฿500,000
฿1,000,000
