= Yes and no (disambiguation) =

Yes and no is a system for expressing affirmation and negation in the English language.

Yes and no may also refer to:

== Books ==
- Yes and No (text), a 12th-century Christian text
- Yes and No (novel), an 1828 novel by Lord Normanby
- Yes and No (play), a 1980 play by Graham Greene
- Yes and No, photobook of Japanese singer Mariko Shinoda

== Music ==
=== Songs ===
- "Yes and No", jazz tune composed by Wayne Shorter, recorded by Branford Marsalis and many others
- "Yes and No", jazz tune composed by Ken Schaphorst from After Blue
- "Yes And No", by Ian Dury & the Blockheads from Laughter (Ian Dury & The Blockheads album) 1980
- "Yes and No", by Ella Jenkins from Come Dance by the Ocean 1991
- "Yes and No", by Hins Cheung composed by Hins Cheung / Yao Hui Zhou from album P.S. I Love You
- "Yes and No", by Venus Hum from album The Colors in the Wheel
- "Yes and No (Paula)" a song by Ian Dury & the Blockheads from the 1980 album Laughter

== See also ==
- Yes or No (disambiguation)
- Yes, No, 1988 studio album by T-Square
