= Deal or No Deal (Maltese game show) =

- Also known as: Deal or No Deal Malta
- Genre: Game show
- Based on: Deal or No Deal by John de Mol Jr.
- Presented by: Pablo Micallef
- Country of origin: Malta
- Original languages: English; Maltese

Production
- Camera setup: Multiple-camera setup
- Running time: 60 minutes (with commercials)

Original release
- Network: TVM
- Release: 1 October 2007 – 2010

The Maltese version of Deal or No Deal began on October 1, 2007, on the national station of Malta, TVM. The prizes start from €0.10, with the top prize being €25,000. The show is hosted by Pablo Micallef.

Presented by Pablo Micallef, it is aired on TVM every day from Monday to Friday from 6:45pm CET onwards.

== How the game works ==
The show starts with 22 identical sealed boxes, similar to the UK and Spanish versions of Deal or No Deal. The US syndicated version of the show follows the same format but with cases.

1. All boxes are sealed in the presence of the public notary. No one but the notary knows what is in the boxes.
2. At the beginning of the show one contestant is chosen from the line up
3. In the first round the player must choose five boxes before the first offer from the Banker.
4. The player must then decide on whether to take the offer. Pablo then asks them the question, Deal Or No Deal?. The player must answer either, Deal to accept the offer or No Deal to decline the offer and carry on.
5. In the second round 3 boxes are opened before the player receives another offer from the Banker. Again Pablo will ask them the question.
6. Three boxes are opened in the third, fourth and fifth round followed by the question Deal Or No Deal?.
7. If the player decides to 'No Deal' they will continue in this fashion until only two boxes remain.
8. When the last two boxes remain the Banker will give his final offer.
9. If the player says No Deal at this point, the Banker may offer the player to swap their box with the other remaining box. The player may decline or accept the swap.
10. Once a player accepts the offer by saying Deal, the game is still played out in exactly the same way.
11. They must choose the boxes they would have chosen in open play.
12. The Banker will continue to give the offers in order see whether the player has made the best deal.

== Box Values ==
NOTE: Small values are usually replaced with joker prizes.

€0.10
€0.50
€1
€5
€10
€20
€30
€40
€50
€75
€100

€500
€750
€1,000
€1,500
€2,000
€3,000
€4,000
€5,000
€10,000
€15,000
€25,000
