= Yes or No (game show) =

South Korean television series

Yes or No (신동엽의 Yes or No) is a South Korean version of Deal or No Deal on tvN in 2006. The prizes range from as little as 10 won (about US$0.01 and S$0.01, less than €0.01 and £0.01) to as much as 100,000,000 won (about US$104,000, €83,000, S$130,000, and £55,000). The show was hosted by comedian Shin Dong-yup.

The top prize was won by Lee Chang-geun (이창근) on the episode aired on June 23, 2007.

Comedian Park Su-hong also won 100,000,000 won when the top prize was raised to 200,000,000 won on October 9, 2007. He donated his winnings to CJ Donors Camp.

== Prizes ==
| ₩10 | ₩1,000,000 |
| ₩100 | ₩2,000,000 |
| ₩500 | ₩3,000,000 |
| ₩1,000 | ₩4,000,000 |
| ₩2,500 | ₩5,000,000 |
| ₩5,000 | ₩7,500,000 |
| ₩7,500 | ₩10,000,000 |
| ₩10,000 | ₩20,000,000 |
| ₩20,000 | ₩30,000,000 |
| ₩30,000 | ₩40,000,000 |
| ₩40,000 | ₩50,000,000 |
| ₩50,000 | ₩75,000,000 |
| ₩100,000 | ₩100,000,000 |

== Differences from Deal or No Deal ==
The player is given several chances to change his/her bag and open it right away. In later episodes, there are red lines which contain the five highest price ranges. In the red line version, two players will play in the first three rounds; the second player will open the last case. If all of the red line amounts are opened before round 3 ends, the second player will get the opportunity to play the real game.

== Variation ==
A variation of the show was embedded in a variety show called Idol World. Super Junior-T played the game and there were only 10 cases. The prize goes from ₩10 (about US$0.01 and ¥1, less than €0.01 and £0.01) to ₩1,000,000 (about US$1,073, ¥116,000, €723, and, £521). They rejected all the banker's offers of ₩52,000, ₩50,800 and ₩50,000, and finally won ₩100,000 in their case. The board is shown below:

| ₩10 | ₩50,000 |
| ₩100 | ₩100,000 |
| ₩1,000 | ₩200,000 |
| ₩5,000 | ₩500,000 |
| ₩10,000 | ₩1,000,000 |
