= Deal or No Deal (Egyptian game show) =

TV game show

- Genre: Game show
- Presented by: Amir Karara; Michel Sanan
- Country of origin: Egypt
- No. of seasons: 2
- No. of episodes: 61

Production
- Camera setup: Multiple-camera setup
- Running time: 50 minutes (with commercials)
- Production company: Endemol

Original release
- Network: MBC 1; LBC
- Release: September 15, 2004 – 2006

Deal or No Deal is an Arabic version of the Deal or No Deal and was first broadcast on September 15, 2004, with a brief weekly run on the Pan-Arabic channel MBC 1, called Al Safqa (الصفقة) and hosted by Amir Karara. The top prize was $1,000,000, which has been the biggest prize to be won on any Middle Eastern game show at the time.

After being cancelled after only six episodes due to low viewership, the show was revived as a daily program between April 1, 2005 and 2006 on LBC, called Deal or No Deal and hosted by Michel Sanan. The top prize was US$250,000, and used the French format. A contestant won the top prize after refused the offer of US$71,000.

== MBC 1 version ==
The contenders for this show came from various Middle Eastern countries, the show was taped in Cairo, Egypt.

=== Gameplay ===
The show starts with 26 contenders being asked five general-knowledge questions, each one with three possible answers. The players answer the questions using keypads. If a player gets a question right, they receive one point for each contestant who got that question wrong. The two best players face off at the Temptation Round.

In this round, one of the two players can decide to leave the game and take home a valuable price. If both reject this option, an open-ended buzzer question is asked. If a contestant buzzes in with the correct answer, they proceed. If a contestant buzzes in with a wrong answer, they get eliminated and their opponent moves on to the final round where the case game is played.

After the winning player has selected his briefcase, the 25 contenders who did not make it to the final round are given one of the 25 remaining cases each. As in the original Dutch version, the finalist had to open all the other cases over the course of nine rounds. When the finalist selects a case to be opened, the player holding it has to guess its content and receive a small amount of money if his guess is proved to be correct. In Round 1, this prize was US$600; for any subsequent round it was decreased by 100 dollars. From Round 6 on, the prize remained at US$100.

If the main player is not sure about taking or rejecting a bank offer, they can also ask a friend or relative who accompanied them to the studio, or even the entire audience which will cast their vote via keypad (Deal/No Deal) - the result will be shown to the player in percentage terms.

=== Case values ===
The case game consists of 26 cases, which ranges from $0.01 to $1,000,000:

Left side	Right side
$0.01	$1,000
$0.05	$2,500
$0.10	$5,000
$0.20	$10,000
$0.50	$20,000
$1	$30,000
$5	$50,000
$10	$100,000
$25	$200,000
$50	$300,000
$100	$400,000
$250	$500,000
$500	$1,000,000

== LBC version ==
The show consists of 22 boxes, which ranges from $0.01 to $250,000:

Left side	Right side
$0.01	$1,000
Joke prize (or $1)	$2,500
Joke prize (or $5)	$5,000
Joke prize (or $10)	$10,000
Joke prize (or $25)	$15,000
Joke prize (or $50)	$25,000
$100	$50,000
$150	$75,000
$200	$100,000
$300	$125,000
$500	$250,000
