= Sdelka ili ne =

- Also known as: Deal or No Deal
- Bulgarian: Сделка или не
- Genre: TV Game
- Presented by: Rumen Lukanov (2005–2018); Nencho Balabanov (2023–2026); Pavel Vladimirov (2026-)
- Country of origin: Bulgaria
- Original language: Bulgarian
- No. of seasons: 15

Production
- Executive producers: SIA Advertising, Endemol, Blue Box Entertainment

Original release
- Network: Nova TV
- Release: September 19, 2005

Sdelka ili ne (Cyrillic: Сделка или не), is the Bulgarian version of Deal or No Deal that aired on Nova Television. Players on this version could win between ten stotinki (0.10) and 100,000 leva (originally 75,000 in the first season). Occasionally, there was a 200,000 leva prize (with 750 leva value removed). There is also a box that contains a non-monetary object. The show started on September 19, 2005 and aired for eleven seasons.

As of June 24, 2011, the end of the fifth season, more than 6.5 million leva had been won by 1,108 contestants, including two 75,000 leva winners and four 100,000 leva winners. The first 75,000 leva winner was Veneta Raykova (Венета Райкова), a member of the VIP Brother cast in Bulgaria. She won during the first season of the show. The other was Aleksandar Micic (Александър Мицич) who sold his 50,000 leva box for that amount on the May 10, 2011 episode. The 100,000 leva winners include a contestant on the December 8, 2006 episode, Niki Kitaetsa (Ники Китаеца) on the September 18, 2007 episode, and Sevil Saliev (Севил Салиев) on the December 22, 2008 episode.

Since the sixth season, there have been two more 100,000 leva winners, including Mariela Pepeldzhiyska (Мариела Пепелджийска) on the January 23, 2012 episode, and Plevenchaninat Iskren (Плевенчанинът Искрен) on the January 24, 2013 episode.

On December 25 and December 26, 2013 specials, the grand prize was increased to 500,000 leva; a contestant won 100,000 leva on December 25. On June 27, 2014 special, the grand prize was increased to 1,000,000 leva; that day the contestant won 25,000 leva. In late January 2016, the game was taken off the air, with Family Feud airing in its place. After a one-year break, the show returned in September 2017 with a top prize of 1 kg of gold (about 68,500 leva). The show left the airwaves altogether in 2018.

On September 4, 2023, the show returned with full force, with a new studio and a new presenter – Nencho Balabanov. Players on this version can win between one stotinka (0.01) and 100,000 leva.

Also, the new host uses a cell phone to talk to the banker instead of a desk phone in previous seasons.

The previous host Rumen Lukanov came back on the screen for 1 week due to the 20th anniversary of the show.

== Box Values (in euros) ==
€0.01
€0.10
€0.50
€1
€2
€5
€10
€25
€50
€100
€200
€300

€500
€750
€1,000
€1,500
€2,500
€5,000
€7,500
€10,000
€15,000
€20,000
€30,000
€50,000
