= Esra Erol (TV presenter) =

Turkish TV presenter

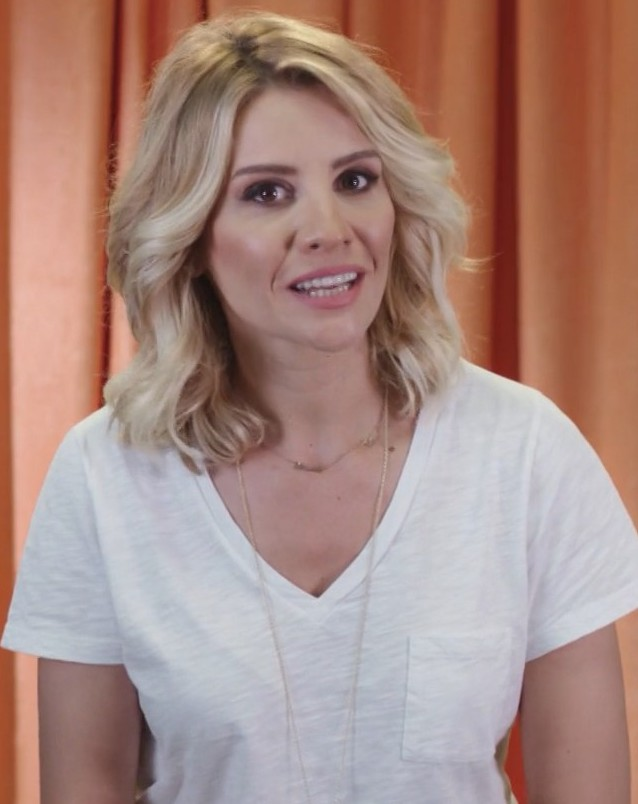
- Erol in 2017
- Born: 12 May 1982 (age 44); Istanbul, Turkey
- Occupation: TV presenter
- Years active: 2003–present
- Spouse: Ali Özbir (m. 2010)
- Children: 2
- Website: www.esraerol.com.tr

Esra Erol Özbir (born 12 May 1982) is a Turkish television presenter.

== Biography ==
Erol was born on 12 May 1982 in Istanbul to Necla Sinoplu and Seyfi Erol, a policeman. She has four sisters. She studied china ceramics design at a high school in Kütahya and continued her education at an open plan school. Esra Erol, who took a diction course at Maltepe University, subsequently studied at Marmara University's radio-television department. Erol first came to attention with the program Turkuaz on Kanal D. She then started to present a marriage program on Flash TV with the program Dest-i İzdivaç and soon became a familiar face on national channels. She is a recipient of three Golden Butterfly Awards for Best Female TV Presenter.

== Filmography ==
=== TV programs ===
- 2003 - Siemens Mobile Kuşak (Teknoloji TV)
- 2005–2007 - Turkuaz (Kanal D)
- 2007 - Esra Erol'la Dest-i İzdivaç (Flash TV)
- 2008 - Esra Erol'la İzdivaç (Star TV)
- 2009–2013 - Esra Erol'da Evlen Benimle (ATV)
- 2013–2015 - Esra Erol'la (Fox)
- 2015–present - Esra Erol'da (ATV)
- 2026–present - Var Mısın Yok Musun (ATV)

=== TV series ===
- Kalp Gözü (Kanal 7) - 2004
- Cennet Mahallesi (Show TV) - 2004
- Çemberimde Gül Oya - 2005
- Tuzak - 2005
- Alemin Kıralı (episode 56) (ATV) - 2012
- Aldatmak (ATV) - 2023

=== Film ===
- Başkan (TV film) - 2005
- Kanal-İ-Zasyon - 2009
- Kamerayla İzdivaç - 2010
- Yapışık Kardeşler - 2015

== Awards ==
| Year | Award | Category |
|---|---|---|
| 2011 | 38tn Golden Butterfly Awards | Best Female TV Presenter |
| 2012 | 1st Crystal Mouth Media Awards | Best Female TV Presenter |
| 2012 | 11th Magazinci.com Internet Media (The Bests) | Social Responsibility Award (Evlen Benimle) |
| 2012 | 39th Golden Butterfly Awards | Best Female TV Presenter |
| 2013 | Karadeniz Foundation (KarVak) Awards | Best TV Program Presenter of the Year |
| 2013 | 2nd Crystal Mouth Media Awards | Best TV Program by a Female Presenter (Esra Erol'da Evlen Benimle) |
| 2013 | MGD 19th Golden Objective Awards | Best Female TV Program Presenter |
| 2014 | 13th magazinci.com Internet Media (The Bests) | Social Responsibility Award (Umut Evleri) |
| 2014 | 5th Quality of Magazine Awards | Best TV Program Presenter |
| 2014 | 3rd Crystal Mouth Media Awards | Best TV Program by a Female Presenter (Esra Erol'la) |
| 2014 | 41st Golden Butterfly Awards | Best Female TV Presenter |
| 2016 | 2nd Elele Avon Women Awards | Social Responsibility Award |
| 2016 | 16th Magazinci.com Internet Media (The Bests) | Best Program by a Female Presenter (Esra Erol'da) |
| 2016 | MGD 22nd Golden Objective Awards | Best Female TV Presenter |
| 2020 | 8th Ayaklı Newspaper TV Stars Awards | Best Daytime Program (Esra Erol'da) |
| 2020 | Şehit and Gazi Family Awards | Honorary Award |
| 2021 | 9th Ayaklı Newspaper Awards | Best Female TV Presenter |
| 2021 | 9th Ayaklı Newspaper Awards | Best Daytime Program (Esra Erol'da) |
| 2021 | Gossip Mag Business Magazine Awards | Best Daytime Women's Program of the Year (Esra Erol'da) |
| 2021 | Istanbul University 7th Golden 61 Awards | Best Female TV presenter |
| 2022 | The Best of Time Awards | Best Daytime Women's Program of the Year (Esra Erol'da) |
| 2022 | MGD 26th Golden Objective Awards | Best Daytime Program (Esra Erol'da) |
| 2022 | Istanbul University 8th Golden 61 Awards | Best Female TV Presenter |
| 2023 | 3rd International Zirve Awards | The Summit's Best Daytime Program (Esra Erol'da) |
| 2023 | 49th Golden Butterfly Awards | Best Daytime Program (Esra Erol'da) |
| 2023 | Istanbul University 9th Golden 61 Awards | Best Female TV Presenter |
| 2024 | 10th Ayaklı Newspaper Awards | Best Female TV Presenter |
| 2024 | 10th Ayaklı Newspaper Awards | Best Daytime Program (Esra Erol'da) |
| 2024 | İKÜ Career Honorary Awards | Most Admired Daytime Program (Esra Erol'da) |
| 2024 | Mimar Sinan Awards | Mimar Sinan of the Year |
| 2024 | 50th Golden Butterfly Awards | Best Daytime Program (Esra Erol'da) |
| 2024 | Istanbul University 10th Golden 61 Awards | Best Daytime Program of the Year (Esra Erol'da) |
| 2025 | 11th Ayaklı Newspaper Awards | Best Female TV Presenter |
| 2025 | 11th Ayaklı Newspaper Awards | Best Daytime Program (Esra Erol'da) |
