= ¡Allá tú! =

Spanish television series

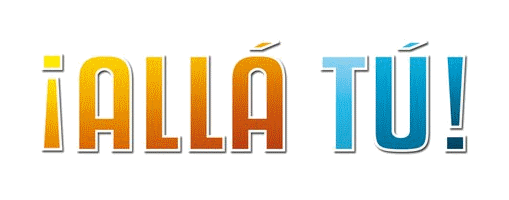
- ¡Allá Tú! logo in Cuatro
- Presented by: Jesús Vázquez
- Country of origin: Spain
- No. of episodes: ~1,000

Production
- Camera setup: Multiple-camera setup
- Running time: 50 minutes (with commercials)

Original release
- Network: Telecinco
- Release: January 26, 2004 – present

¡Allá Tú! logo in TeleCinco

¡Allá tú! (Spanish for "It's Your Business") is the Spanish version of Deal or No Deal. It was initially broadcast by Telecinco between 2004 and 2008 and later changed to sister channel Cuatro for a comeback in 2011, before returning to Telecinco in 2023.

The original version was hosted by Jesús Vázquez, but during Jesús's break to focus on another Endemol show, Operación Triunfo, Arturo Valls and Silvia Jato filled in for him. Jesús reprised his role as host for the entirety of the 2011 revival and the first three seasons of the 2023 revival. The currently airing fourth season is hosted by Juanra Bonet.

This version is very similar to the French and Italian versions, with 22 boxes held by 22 players, each representing one of the 50 provinces of Spain or one of the two autonomous cities (Ceuta and Melilla) (except for the 2006 specials, which played like the US version, with 26 cases held by 26 models).

On June 19, 2007, Gilbert Trilles from Tarragona became the first top prize winner, winning €600,000. On July 25, 2011, Maria del Carmen Bonilla from Asturias won €300,000 and became the second top prize winner.

== Gameplay ==
=== 2004–2008 ===
The program begins by each contestant being described by name and region (usually the newest contestant to replace the one who played last episode receives a special presentation), and then they answer a qualifying question, usually about statistics (i.e. "What percentage of the Spanish elderly have used the Internet? 1: 6%, 2: 26%, 3: 69%"). Out of those who answered correctly, one is drawn, who proceeds to the podium with the box they randomly selected before the game. Each box contains a different amount of money, from €0.10 to €300,000 (or one of 3 joke prizes).

In the main game, the contestant's objective is to find out what their box contains by removing the boxes of the other 21 contestants: when each box is selected, the card with the box's value on is shown to the camera before the value of the card is out of play, and the display shows the amounts remaining.

At various points in the game, La Banca (The Banker) makes a phone call to the host and makes the contestant a cash offer to purchase their box and for the contestant to quit the game based on the value of the boxes left. The contestant then decides whether to accept the offer and end the game or decline the offer and continue playing.

In the first round the contestant opens six boxes, three in the second, third, fourth, and fifth, and then one in the final two rounds. One player plays for the entire episode. When their episode finishes, a new contestant replaces them in the wings.

In 2005, the show started a phone-in feature where the in-studio contestant would split their winnings with a lucky at-home caller. As a result, many values on the board were increased, with the top prize doubling to €600,000.

==== 2006 Special ====
In 2006, ¡Allá tú! aired a primetime special based on the US version called La Noche de los 2.000.000€ (The €2,000,000 Night), with a new set similar to the US version and 26 cases held by models (as opposed to 22 boxes held by other contestants). The special featured two contestants, each playing for €1,000,000 (split with an at-home caller, like the daytime version).

=== 2011 version ===
The show was revived in 2011 on Telecinco's sister network Cuatro, with Jesús Vasquez returning as host. The SMS game did not return, and the original board was brought back. The new version premiered on January 10, 2011. On the week of May 30, 2011, the program celebrated 100 episodes by introducing a new twist—5 green boxes; four of them each contain €0, but one contains the maximum prize of €300,000. The twist is kept from then on, except while four of the boxes still contain nothing, the last one contains either €30,000, €60,000, €120,000, or €300,000, chosen at random. On October 31, 2011, it was announced that this version would be cancelled, with its final episode airing on November 4.

=== 2023–present ===
The first season of the 2023 revival aired on Sunday nights as a weekly prime time format with a runtime similar to that of the 2006 million-euro specials. The show featured two contestants on each episode, each playing for a top prize of €250,000. The revival introduced two new elements to the gameplay:

- El pulsador de la oferta extra (The Extra Offer Buzzer): Before hearing the first offer, the player is asked to guess how much money the Banker has offered to purchase the box. If the player guesses correctly or is off by €1,000 or less, they have the option to activate the buzzer and request one additional offer from the Banker, aside from the ones that happen when specific numbers of boxes remain, at any time in the game.
- La comunidad de la suerte (The Lucky Region): The Banker can offer the player to abandon the game if it isn't going well, and instead try to guess which Spanish region is written in a smaller, silver box. The player wins €30,000 for guessing correctly in the first attempt and €10,000 for guessing correctly in the second attempt, but the player leaves without any money if neither guess is correct.

The second season was a daily format, akin to the original version, airing Monday thru Thursday (later Monday thru Wednesday) each week. As a result of the change in format, one contestant was featured each episode, and the top prize was lowered to €150,000. Additionally, the prizes for La comunidad de la suerte were cut in half to €15,000 for the first attempt and €5,000 for the second attempt.

The third season featured episodes recorded in 2024, and is the same format as the first season.

The currently airing fourth season premiered on January 12, 2026, with Juanra Bonet taking over as the new host. It airs Monday to Friday (once aired every day). The gameplay is largely the same, with a few differences:

- The top prize was originally €100,000, but on March 26, 2026, it was raised permanently to €150,000.
- A mystery box called the Black Box (la Caja Negra) has been added to the board, which contains a random amount of money, which is never above the highest amount, nor is it below the lowest. No amount on the regular board can appear in the Black Box.
- Similar to the Italian version, the player invites a companion to play the game with them. Unlike the Italian version, however, the show surprises the contestant with their choice of friend or family member.
- El juego de las comunidades now offers €10,000 for a successful first attempt and €3,000 for a successful second attempt. Additionally, the number of choices on the second attempt will be reduced to four, and the contestant may receive an offer on the second attempt, which can be accepted or rejected.
- The Offer Button has been removed.

== Box/Case Values ==
NOTE: In each episode, three of the smaller values are replaced with three different joke prizes (except for the million euro specials).

Box/Case Values == NOTE: In each episode, three of the smaller values are replaced with three different joke prizes (except for the million euro specials).

2004, 2011

€0.10	€1,000
€0.50	€2,000
€1	€3,000
€5	€6,000
€10	€9,000
€20	€12,000
€50	€15,000
€100	€30,000
€200	€60,000
€300	€120,000
€600	€300,000

2005-2008

€0.10	€1,500
€0.50	€3,000
€1	€6,000
€5	€12,000
€10	€18,000
€30	€24,000
€50	€30,000
€100	€60,000
€300	€120,000
€600	€240,000
€900	€600,000

La noche de los €2.000.000

€0.10	€1,000
€0.50	€3,000
€1	€6,000
€5	€9,000
€10	€12,000
€15	€18,000
€30	€30,000
€50	€60,000
€100	€90,000
€200	€120,000
€300	€300,000
€400	€600,000
€500	€1,000,000

2026–present

€0.10	CAJA NEGRA
€0.50	€2,500
€1	€5,000
€5	€7,500
€10	€10,000
€20	€12,500
€50	€15,000
€100	€25,000
€250	€50,000
€500	€75,000
€750	€150,000
