= Deal or No Deal =

International game show franchise

- Created by: John de Mol Jr.
- Original work: Miljoenenjacht (The Netherlands)
- Owner: Banijay Entertainment
- Years: 2000–present

Deal or No Deal (also known by its initialism DOND) is the name of several closely related television game shows, the first of which (launching the format) was the Dutch Miljoenenjacht (Hunt/Chase for Millions).

The centerpiece of this format is the final round (a.k.a. the "case game" or "main game") which is played with up to 26 cases (or, in some versions, boxes), each containing randomly assigned sums of money. After the player for the case game is determined, this contender claims one case or a box at the start of the game, without its contents being revealed. The contestant then chooses the other cases or boxes, one at a time, to be immediately opened and removed from play. Throughout the game, the player is offered an amount of money or prizes to sell back their case and end the game, being asked the titular question, "Deal or No Deal?" If the contestant rejects every deal and eliminates all the other cases, the player keeps the money that was in their case. While almost all contestants win money, a winning outcome is dependent on whether the player should have taken one of the deals or should have held onto the original case or box until the very end.

== Gameplay ==
The gameplay of the show differs from country to country. In some countries, there is a preliminary contest in which the studio audience is whittled down to one final contender by several trivia question rounds, this final contender then proceeds to the main game. This was the format used by the Dutch show Miljoenenjacht (Hunt/Chase for Millions) which initiated the Deal or No Deal game (the initial version of the Dutch show was based on a German format called Die Chance deines Lebens (The Chance of your Lifetime), which was based on trivia questions and did not have the briefcase element at all). There are also some versions with the number of players equal to the number of cases, each player receives one case. Via a short trivia round or a random selection, one player is selected to be the contestant for the main game with their case. In other countries, there is only one preselected contestant who will play the main game without any preliminary contest.

The main game revolves around the opening of a set of numbered briefcases, each of which contains a different prize (cash or otherwise). The contents (i.e., the values) of all of the cases are known at the start of the game, but the specific location of any prize is unknown. The contestant claims (or is assigned) a case to begin the game. The case's value is not revealed until the conclusion of the game.

The contestant then begins choosing cases that are to be removed from play. The amount inside each chosen case is immediately revealed; by process of elimination, the amount revealed cannot be inside the case the contestant initially claimed (or was assigned). Throughout the game, after a predecided number of cases have been opened, the "Banker" offers the contestant an amount of money and/or prizes to quit the game; the offer is based roughly on the amounts remaining in play and the contestant's demeanor, so the bank tries to 'buy' the contestant's case for a lower price than what's inside the case. The player then answers the titular question, choosing:

- "Deal", accepting the offer presented and ending the game, or
- "No Deal", rejecting the offer and continuing the game.

This process of removing cases and receiving offers continues, until either the player accepts an offer to 'deal', or all offers have been rejected and the values of all unchosen cases are revealed. Should a player end the game by taking a deal (except if the deal was made in the final round), a pseudo-game is continued from that point to see how much the player could have won by remaining in the game. Depending on subsequent choices and offers, it is determined whether or not the contestant made a "good deal", i.e. won more than if the game were allowed to continue.

Since the range of possible values is known at the start of each game, how much the banker offers at any given point changes based on what values have been eliminated (i.e. the offer increases if lower values are eliminated and decreases if upper values are eliminated). To promote suspense and lengthen games, the banker's offer is usually less than the expected value dictated by probability theory, particularly early in the game. Generally, the offers early in the game are very low relative to the values still in play, but near the end of the game approach (or even exceed) the average of the remaining values.

Only a few people have ever won the top prize on any version of the show (see table below). For a contestant to win the top prize the player would have to select the case containing the top prize and reject every offer the banker makes during the game. The chances of a player selecting the top prize are 4–5% depending on how many amounts are in the game.

== Top prize winners ==
All amounts below the prizes are their equivalents in United States dollars at the time of their win.

Country	Name(s)	Date	Amount won	Previous offer	Other amount	Notes
Afghanistan گنجین/Ganjina	Mohammad Easa Sediqi	Prior to October 25, 2010	Af. 1,000,000 ($23,240)	Box Swap (declined)	Af. 2,500 ($58.10)	First top prize winner in Afghan history
Afghanistan گنجین/Ganjina	(unknown)	Prior to November 28, 2012	Af. 1,000,000 ($19,569)	Af. 342,000 ($6,693)	Af. 10,000 ($196)	The banker first offered Af. 311,000, then Af. 342,000, then a chance to swap the boxes. All were declined. Rebroadcast June 5, 2013.
Afghanistan گنجین/Ganjina	(unknown)	Prior to June 6, 2013	Af. 1,000,000 ($18,484)	Af. 355,500 ($6,571)	Af. 30,000 ($555)	The banker first offered Af. 263,300, then Af. 355,500. Both were declined. Rebroadcast June 6, 2013.
Algeria ادي ولا خلي/Eddi Ouela Kheli	Mohamed Meziane	July 7, 2015	10,000,000 DA ($100,450)	3,200,000 DA ($32,144)	200 DA ($2.01)	
Algeria ادي ولا خلي/Eddi Ouela Kheli	Khemisti Mohammed bin Sayeh	March 15, 2016	5,000,000 DA + 1,000,000 DA ($45,117 + $9,023)	177,000 DA ($1,597)	10,000 DA ($90.23)	Won 5,000,000 DA from the box along with a 1,000,000 DA bonus.
Arab League Deal or No Deal	Abbas Hussein	May 5, 2006	$250,000	$71,000	$25,000	
Argentina Trato Hecho	Martín	October 3, 2021	AR$2,000,000 ($20,262)	AR$1,000,000 ($10,131)	AR$400,000 ($4,052)	
Australia Deal or No Deal	Dean Cartechini	June 17, 2004	A$200,000 ($137,384)	A$102,500 ($70,409)	A$5 ($3.43)	First top prize winner.
Australia Deal or No Deal	Anh Do (celebrity)	September 19, 2007	A$200,000 ($167,238)	A$125,000 ($104,524)	A$75,000 ($62,714)	Second top prize winner. Money went to home viewer. The second celebrity (since David Graham) and the first to actually win the prize.
Australia Deal or No Deal	Leanne Benbow	June 2, 2010	A$200,000 ($166,630)	A$115,000 ($95,812)	A$100,000 ($83,315)	The first woman (and the third) to win the top prize. Had the "Dream Finish" – the last 2 cases were the highest 2 in the game.
Australia Deal or No Deal	Chris Doyle	August 23, 2011	A$200,000 ($208,014)	A$130,000 ($135,209)	A$100,000 ($104,007)	Last winner of the top prize before the series ends in 2013. Also had the "Dream Finish" – the last 2 cases were the highest 2 in the game.
Australia Deal or No Deal	Zali Muscatello	February 26, 2025	A$100,000 ($63,310)	A$50,000 ($31,655)	A$5,000 ($3,166)	First top prize winner of the Channel 10 reboot.
Australia Deal or No Deal	Sandra Sully (Celebrity)	June 30, 2025	A$100,000 ($65,288)	A$37,000 ($24,157)	A$2,500 ($1,632)	Second top prize winner of the Channel 10 iteration, and the second celebrity overall to win the top prize. The winnings went to charity.
Azerbaijan Davam Ya Tamam	Sevda	March 26, 2017	30,000 AZN ($17,595)	15,000 AZN ($8,798)	1 AZN ($0.59)	
Azerbaijan Davam Ya Tamam	Rashad	July 9, 2017	30,000 AZN ($17,627)	11,030 AZN ($6,481) (Case swap accepted)	1,500 AZN ($881)	
Belize Tek It or Leave It	Valerie Stevens	March 3, 2009	BZ$15,000 ($7,615)	(Unknown)	(Unknown)	
Brazil Topa ou Não Topa	Paulo	April 2007	R$1,000,000 ($490,000)	R$444,000 ($218,000)	R$100 ($49)	
Bulgaria Сделка или не Sdelka ili ne	Veneta Raykova (Венета Райкова) (celebrity)	May 15, 2006	75,000 BGN ($46,000)	(unknown)	(unknown)	
Bulgaria Сделка или не Sdelka ili ne	Tsveta from Gaitaninovo (Цвета от Гайтаниново)	December 8, 2006	100,000 BGN ($67,986)	(unknown)	5,000 BGN ($3,399)	
Bulgaria Сделка или не Sdelka ili ne	Niki Kitaetsa (Ники Китаеца) (celebrity)	September 18, 2007	100,000 BGN ($70,871)	40,000 BGN ($28,348)	1,000 BGN ($709)	
Bulgaria Сделка или не Sdelka ili ne	Sevil Saliev (Севил Салиев)	December 22, 2008	100,000 BGN ($71,179)	(unknown)	(unknown)	
Bulgaria Сделка или не Sdelka ili ne	Mariela Pepeldzhiyska (Мариела Пепелджийска)	January 23, 2012	100,000 BGN ($65,862)	Box Swap (accepted)	2,500 BGN ($1,647)	
Bulgaria Сделка или не Sdelka ili ne	Plevenchaninat Iskren (Плевенчанинът Искрен)	January 24, 2013	100,000 BGN ($67,988)	25,000 BGN ($16,997)	0.20 BGN ($0.14)	
Cambodia ព្រម ឬមិនព្រម Prom Rer Min Prom	(Unknown)	February 2009	10,000,000 KHR ($2,410)	(unknown)	(unknown)	
Cambodia ព្រម ឬមិនព្រម Prom Rer Min Prom	(Unknown)	February 2009	10,000,000 KHR ($2,405)	(unknown)	750,000 KHR ($181)	
Chile ¡Allá Tú!	Mauricio Hermosilla	May 4, 2007	CL$10,000,000 ($19,050)	CL$6,500,000 ($12,383)	CL$5,000,000 ($9,525)	
Chile ¡Allá Tú!	Farándula	August 29, 2007	CL$10,000,000 ($19,010)	Box Swap	CL$50,000 ($95.05)	
Ecuador Trato Hecho	(unknown)	2006	$100,000	(unknown)	$2,500	
Egypt لعبة الحياة; Lebet el Hayat	Amal Mohammad	Prior to November 16, 2009	E£250,000 ($45,825)	(unknown)	E£0.50 ($0.09)	
Egypt لعبة الحياة; Lebet el Hayat	Sameh	Prior to April 15, 2010	E£250,000 ($45,323)	(unknown)	E£0.50 ($0.09)	
Egypt لعبة الحياة; Lebet el Hayat	Marwa Ali	Prior to September 3, 2010	E£500,000 ($87,660)	Box Swap	E£250 ($43.83)	
Egypt ديل أور نو ديل: الإختيار; Deal or no deal: El Ikhtiyar	Sibai Wahba	September 12, 2012	E£250,000 ($41,037)	Box Swap (accepted)	E£10,000 ($1,641)	
France À prendre ou à laisser	Mylène	March 4, 2004	€500,000 ($609,850)	Box Swap (declined)	€100,000 ($121,970)	
France À prendre ou à laisser	Éric	March 29, 2004	€500,000 ($605,900)	€240,000 ($290,832)	€10,000 ($12,118)	The banker also offered box swap and €200,000.
France À prendre ou à laisser	Françoise	April 6, 2004	€500,000 ($604,500)	€375,000 ($453,375)	€250,000 ($302,250)	
France À prendre ou à laisser	Pascal Olmeta	July 17, 2004	€620,000 ($704,320)	€620,000 ($704,320)	CD or €1,000,000 (CD or $1,923,200)	Pascal dealt at €620,000. This was a celebrity edition that was only hold for Saturday evenings, the jackpot was €1,000,000
France À prendre ou à laisser	Fred	February 28, 2005	€500,000 ($662,850)	(unknown)	(unknown)	
France À prendre ou à laisser	Sabrina	November 29, 2005	€500,000 ($590,030)	€350,000 ($413,021)	€75,000 ($88,505)	The banker also offered €200,000, €300,000 and €350,000; it is very rare for a contestant to have more than one or offers after a single round.
France À prendre ou à laisser	Vincent	May 25, 2006	€500,000 ($568,000)	Box swap (declined)	€250 ($284)	The joker box was a top prize of €630,000 ($715,680); The joker box would originally have €10,000 per correct answer, But on the date of this episode, the joker box would be €30,000 for every correct answer, and 21 out of got it right.
France À prendre ou à laisser	Alexandria	September 29, 2006	€1,000,000 ($1,802,000)	(unknown)	(unknown)	On September 4, 2006, the jackpot of À prendre ou à laisser was changed from €500,000 to €1,000,000. Alexandria is the highest winner ever of À prendre ou à laisser.
France À prendre ou à laisser	Marie-Ange Franceschi	January 23, 2009	€500,000 ($650,280)	€210,000 ($273,118)	€100,000 ($130,056)	
France À prendre ou à laisser	Sébastien	November 25, 2014	€100,000 ($124,240)	€31,000 ($38,514)	€10 ($12.42)	
Georgia ვა-ბანკი Va-Bank	Rezo and Archil Arveladze (celebrities)	February 3, 2009	50,000 lari ($30,018)	25,000 lari ($15,009)	50 lari ($30.02)	
Greece Deal	Georgia Kastrada (Γεωργία Καστράντα)	November 10, 2006	€200,000 ($256,702)	€80,000 ($102,681)	€1,000 ($1,284)	Received €100,000, another half was received by a text winner
Greece Deal	Giorgos Gkantadakis (Γιώργος Γκανταδάκης)	April 6, 2017	€60,000 ($63,858)	€47,000 ($50,022)	€40,000 ($42,572)	
Greece Deal	Argyris (Αργύρης)	December 11, 2018	€60,000 ($62,709)	€25,000 ($29,800)	€100 ($112)	Argyris declined to buy Box 23, which would have doubled his winnings to €120,000.
Greece Deal	Ioannis (Ιωάννης)	December 13, 2021	€60,000 ($67,898)	€48,000 ($54,319)	€40,000 ($45,266)	
Hungary Áll az alku	Szőke Sándor	May 23, 2006	50,000,000 Ft. ($238,000)	13,000,000 Ft. ($61,900)	6,000,000 Ft. ($28,600)	
Hungary Áll az alku	Bereczki Máté	October 19, 2006	100,000,000 Ft. ($469,770)	9,500,000 Ft. ($44,630)	25,000 Ft. ($117)	
Hungary Áll az alku	Csorba Árpád	April 26, 2010	21,000,000 Ft. ($106,680)	15,000,000 Ft. ($76,200)	13,000,000 Ft. ($66,040)	
India Deal or No Deal	Ayushmann Khurrana (celebrity)	November 15, 2015	₹90,00,000 (₹9,000,000) ($136,445)	₹70,00,000 (₹7,000,000) ($106,124)	₹50,00,000 (₹5,000,000) ($75,803)	His briefcase contained the top prize ₹1,00,00,000 but his winnings were reduced by 10% due to answering the final question wrong.
Italy Affari Tuoi	Roberto Pepi	February 4, 2004	€500,000 ($627,805)	€250,000 ($305,687)	€15,000 ($19,223)	
Italy Affari Tuoi	Francesca Madeddu	December 16, 2004	€500,000 ($671,175)	€300,000 ($402,705)	€25,000 ($33,559)	
Italy Affari Tuoi	Clarissa Meneghini	December 19, 2007	€500,000 ($719,525)	€170,000 ($244,639)	€30,000 ($43,172)	
Italy Affari Tuoi	Danilo Anderlini	September 17, 2008	€500,000 ($714,575)	€170,000 ($242,956)	€30,000 ($42,875)	
Italy Affari Tuoi	Francesca Cataldo	October 22, 2008	€500,000 ($666,895)	€185,000 ($230,408)	€30,000 ($40,014)	
Italy Affari Tuoi	Roberto Caterina	November 23, 2008	€500,000 ($629,450)	€375,000 ($472,088)	€250,000 ($314,725)	
Italy Affari Tuoi	Mara Ancelotti	January 1, 2009	€500,000 ($707,045)	€375,000 ($530,284)	€250,000 ($353,523)	
Italy Affari Tuoi	Stefania Menegazzo	February 23, 2010	€500,000 ($680,020)	€104,000 ($141,444)	Maghetto	
Italy Affari Tuoi	Gabriele Calvello	March 17, 2012	€1,000,000 ($1,317,440)	€313,000 ($412,359)	€0.20 ($0.26)	The top prize was originally €500,000 as usual, but was doubled during the game when the player opened Pacco Matto (crazy box) and found Raddoppia (double).
Italy Affari Tuoi	Mauro Ghiraldini	November 21, 2012	€500,000 ($640,625)	€150,000 ($192,188)	€30,000 ($38,438)	
Italy Affari Tuoi	Patrizia Montalbano	January 25, 2013	€500,000 ($668,467)	€350,000 ($467,927)	€250,000 ($334,234)	
Italy Affari Tuoi	Pierangela Zaccaria	May 29, 2014	€500,000 ($682,054)	€172,000 ($234,626)	€100 ($136)	Also won a €1,000 Provaci bonus.
Italy Affari Tuoi	Alberto Bindi	May 17, 2016	€500,000 ($564,512)	€375,000 ($423,384)	€250,000 ($282,256)	
Italy Affari Tuoi	Alessandro Corona	February 22, 2017	€500,000 ($528,650)	€200,000 ($211,460)	€100,000 ($105,730)	
Italy Affari Tuoi	Luca and Sara Sartori	May 17, 2024	€300,000 ($326,037)	€150,000 ($163,019)	€75,000 ($81,509)	
Italy Affari Tuoi	Ornella Falla and Giuseppe Colella	September 26, 2024	€300,000 ($333,921)	€250,000 ($278,268)	€200,000 ($222,614)	
Italy Affari Tuoi	Francesca Atorino	October 2, 2025	€300,000 ($352,003)	€200,000 ($234,669)	€100,000 ($117,334)	
Italy Affari Tuoi	Angelo Russo	October 3, 2025	€300,000 ($351,754)	€150,000 ($175,877)	€50,000 ($58,626)	For the first time ever, the top prize was won by the contestants in two consecutive episodes.
Malta Deal or No Deal Malta	Maria (Doris) Abela	October 17, 2008	€25,000 ($33,601)	€19,500 ($26,209)	€15,000 ($20,160)	
Mexico Vas o No Vas	Elena	June 11, 2005	Mex$5,000,000 ($460,050) (Saturday)	(unknown)	(unknown)	
Mexico Vas o No Vas	Luis	December 6, 2005	Mex$1,000,000 ($95,360) (weekday)	(unknown)	(unknown)	
Mexico Vas o No Vas	Laura	March 2, 2006	Mex$1,000,000 ($95,580) (weekday)	Mex$700,000 ($66,906)	Mex$400,000 ($38,232)	
Mexico Vas o No Vas	Paty	June 3, 2006	Mex$1,000,000 ($88,130) (weekday)	Mex$550,000 ($48,472)	Mex$100,000 ($8,813)	
Mexico ¿Te la juegas?	María	June 13, 2020	Mex$1,000,000 ($44,940)	Mex$725,000 ($32,582)	Mex$500,000 ($22,470)	
Mexico ¿Te la juegas?	Javo	July 4, 2020	Mex$1,000,000 ($44,670)	Mex$303,000 ($13,535)	Mex$50,000, Mex$250,000 and 1 other Mex$1,000,000 ($2,234, $11,168 and $44,670)	
Malaysia (in English) Deal or No Deal Malaysia	Timothy Shim	March 2, 2008	RM100,000 ($31,307)	RM 50,800 ($15,904)	RM 250 ($78.27)	
Myanmar Deal or No Deal	Min Thu Rein (မင်းသူရိန်)	March 16, 2015	Ks.20,00,000 ($1,930)	Ks.7,90,000 ($762)	Ks.2,00,000 ($193)	Rebroadcast March 31, 2015.
Netherlands Miljoenenjacht; Deal or No Deal	Arno Woesthoff	September 2, 2001	fl.10,000,000 (€4,537,802) ($4,142,220)	Format not yet introduced (Note: Arno Woesthoff was on Miljoenenjacht when the bonus round consisted of seven questions that could add up to 10,000,000 guilders (based on the German game show Die Chance deines Lebens) instead of the case game, which is why there were no other amounts.)		Woesthoff was the biggest winner in worldwide game show history at the time of the show's airing; he would hold the record for almost 13 years until it was broken by Brad Rutter in 2014.
Netherlands Miljoenenjacht; Deal or No Deal	Eelco Schumacher	April 2, 2009	€250,000 ($331,468)	€170,000 ($225,398)	€125,000 ($165,734)	
Peru Trato Hecho/Vas o No Vas	Licet	October 14, 2016	S/.20,000 ($5,877)	Box Swap (accepted)	S/.7,500 ($2,204)	
Philippines Kapamilya, Deal or No Deal	Terry Lim Cua	December 29, 2006	P2,000,000 ($40,740)	P1,400,000 ($28,518)	P1,000,000 ($20,370)	Cua was the only contestant to win P2,000,000 or more on the Filipino version.
Philippines Kapamilya, Deal or No Deal	Aiko Melendez and Candy Pangilinan (celebrities)	November 25, 2008	P1,000,000 ($20,220)	P345,001 ($6,976)	P10 ($0.20)	Christmas Edition (5 P1,000,000 cases)
Philippines Kapamilya, Deal or No Deal	Jhaphet Flordeliza	December 1, 2008	P1,000,000 ($20,400)	P150,000 ($3,060)	P50 ($1.02)	Christmas Edition (5 P1,000,000 cases)
Philippines Kapamilya, Deal or No Deal	Arnel Pineda (celebrity)	December 11, 2008	P1,000,000 ($20,570)	P249,999 ($5,142)	P200 ($4.11)	Christmas Edition (5 P1,000,000 cases)
Philippines Kapamilya, Deal or No Deal	Bearwin Meily (celebrity)	March 23, 2015	P1,000,000 ($22,312)	P614,000 ($13,700)	P100,000 ($2,231)	
Philippines Kapamilya, Deal or No Deal	Ara Mina (celebrity)	April 17, 2015	P1,000,000 ($22,626)	P355,000 ($8,032)	P100 ($2.26)	
Philippines Kapamilya, Deal or No Deal	Joyce Bernal and Bela Padilla (celebrities)	August 14, 2015	P1,000,000 ($21,656)	P699,000 ($15,138)	P400,000 ($8,662)	
Philippines Kapamilya, Deal or No Deal	Kaye Abad and Nikki Valdez (celebrities)	September 7, 2015	P1,000,000 ($21,281)	P510,000 ($10,853)	P50,000 ($1,064)	
Philippines Kapamilya, Deal or No Deal	Janine Tugonon (celebrity)	January 8, 2016	P1,000,000 ($21,164)	P650,000 ($13,757)	P300,000 ($6,349)	
Philippines Kapamilya, Deal or No Deal	David "Abdul" Domanais and Christian "Marsy" Kimp Atip	August 2, 2026 (Note: Most recent top prize winner in the Deal or No Deal franchise to date.)	P1,000,000 ($16,325)	P560,000 ($9,142)	P125,000 ($2,040)	Domanais and Kimp Atip became the first millionaires of the sixth season and since the show's revival.
Romania Batem palma?	David Neacșu	May 1, 2024	100,000 lei ($21,464)	50,500 lei ($10,839)	700 lei ($150)	
Serbia Uzmi ili ostavi	Vidoje	October 19, 2007	RSD 1,500,000 ($24,475)	RSD 615,000 ($10,035)	RSD 500,000 ($8,158)	
South Africa Deal or No Deal	Siyabongo Ngqola	March 17, 2023	R250,000 ($13,616)	R135,000 ($7,352)	R500 ($27.23)	
South Korea Yes or No	Lee Chang-geun (이창근)	June 23, 2007	₩100,000,000 ($107,750)	₩45,000,000 ($48,488)	₩30,000,000 ($32,325)	
Spain ¡Allá tú!	Gilbert	June 19, 2007	€600,000 ($804,018)	€240,000 ($321,607)	€1,500 ($2,010)	Received €300,000; another half was received by an SMS winner.
Spain ¡Allá tú!	María del Carmen Bonilla	July 25, 2011	€300,000 ($431,622)	€29,999 ($43,161)	€20 ($28.77)	
Switzerland Deal or No Deal – Das Risiko	Peter Meier	June 9, 2010	CHF 250,000 ($216,143)	CHF 125,000 ($108,071)	CHF 10,000 ($8,646)	
Tunisia دليلك ملك	Mohamed Mabrouk	March 22, 2006	TND 300,000 ($221,706)	(unknown)	(unknown)	Each winner shared the prize with an SMS participant.
Tunisia دليلك ملك	Mohamed Bashir Menchari	November 13, 2006	TND 500,000 ($379,765)	(unknown)	(unknown)	Each winner shared the prize with an SMS participant.
Tunisia دليلك ملك	Marbrouk	September 13, 2007	TND1,000,000 ($792,390)	(unknown)	TND 500,000 ($396,195)	Each winner shared the prize with an SMS participant.
Tunisia دليلك ملك	Aichoucha	June 13, 2017	TND 2,000,000 ($813,960)	TND 1,100,000 ($447,678)	Joke prize	The banker also offered 200,000 dinars ($81,396), which was refused. The winner also shared the prize with an SMS participant.
Turkey Var mısın? Yok musun?	Ülkühan Yılmaz	October 24, 2009	TL 500,000 ($339,790)	TL 128,000 ($86,986)	TL 20,000 ($13,591)	
United Kingdom Deal or No Deal	Laura Pearce	January 7, 2007	£250,000 ($482,625)	£45,000 ($86,873)	£3,000 ($5,792)	Pearce was the first top prize winner on the UK version.
United Kingdom Deal or No Deal	Alice Munday	March 12, 2009	£250,000 ($344,678)	Banker's Gamble (box swap declined)	1p ($0.014)	Munday initially dealt at £17,500 but was offered the Banker's Gamble when the 1p and £250,000 were remaining. She accepted the gamble, which forfeited the offer and brought the game back into live play.
United Kingdom Deal or No Deal	Suzanne Mulholland	May 13, 2011	£250,000 ($407,055)	£165,000 ($268,656) (box swap accepted)	£100,000 ($162,822)	Mulholland also won an additional prize of a 2-week holiday in Florida as part of "Banker's Birthday" special.
United Kingdom Deal or No Deal	Tegen Roberts	September 22, 2011	£250,000 ($387,735)	£77,000 ($119,422)	£20,000 ($31,019)	Tegen had the strongest board ever after round 3 to the end of the show; a staggering £560,250.60 was still in play after 10 boxes had been opened.
United Kingdom Deal or No Deal	Nong Skett	August 5, 2012	£250,000 ($390,932)	£68,000 ($106,334)	£5 ($7.82)	
United Kingdom Deal or No Deal	Patrick "Paddy" Roberts	August 12, 2013	£250,000 ($386,700)	£140,000 ($216,622)	£75,000 ($116,010)	Paddy was the first male top prize winner on the UK version.
United Kingdom Deal or No Deal	Roop Singh	February 12, 2014	£250,000 ($414,528)	£46,000 ($76,273)	£500 ($829)	Singh declined to buy Box 23, which would have doubled his winnings to £500,000.
United Kingdom Deal or No Deal	Ann Crawford	October 15, 2015	£250,000 ($387,438)	£64,000 ($99,184)	50p ($0.77)	Crawford declined to buy Box 23, which would have vanished her winnings.
United Kingdom Deal or No Deal	Vikki Heenan	December 23, 2016	£250,000 ($306,735)	£66,666 ($81,795)	£750 ($920)	The episode that contains Heenan's win was the final episode of the original run of the UK version.
United States Deal or No Deal	Jessica Robinson	September 1, 2008	$1,000,000	$561,000	$200,000	Robinson was the first top prize winner on the American version. Million Dollar Mission game (5 $1,000,000 cases)
United States Deal or No Deal	Tomorrow Rodriguez	October 29, 2008	$1,000,000	$677,000	$300 and 3x $1,000,000	The final offer of $677,000 (which Rodriguez declined) was given when there were four cases remaining. Million Dollar Mission game (9 $1,000,000 cases)
Uruguay Trato Hecho Edición Parejas	Natalia Cucurullo and Gastón Saldombide	August 17, 2022	U$1,000,000 ($24,929)	U$420,000 ($10,470)	U$30,000 ($748)	
Vietnam Đi tìm ẩn số (Note: The Vietnamese version has 10 top prize winners. 7 are shown here. The other 3 were missing.)	(unknown)	Before October 2005	50,000,000Đ ($3,159)	25,998,000Đ ($1,643)	1Đ ($0.0000632)	First Asian winner. The other case contained the lowest value worldwide.
Vietnam Đi tìm ẩn số	Thanh Xuân	February 14, 2010	100,000,000Đ ($4,808)	?	?	She appeared on a 2012 special episode as the friend of contestant Hồng Hạnh. Her winner was mentioned in this episode.
Vietnam Đi tìm ẩn số	Lê Bình (celebrity)	October 9, 2011	100,000,000Đ ($4,808)	75,411,000Đ ($3,626)	50,000,000Đ ($2,404)	First known celebrity winner. His last 2 cases were the highest 2 in the game.
Vietnam Đi tìm ẩn số	Nguyễn Thụy Minh Trang	July 15, 2012	100,000,000Đ ($4,801)	40,010,000Đ ($1,921)	25,000Đ ($1.20)	First known female winner.
Vietnam Đi tìm ẩn số	(unknown)	2014	100,000,000Đ ($4,671)	?	?	
Vietnam Đi tìm ẩn số	(unknown)	August 2015	100,000,000Đ ($4,660)	?	?	
Vietnam Đi tìm ẩn số	Nguyễn Thị Đào	February 28, 2016	100,000,000Đ ($4,459)	26,100,000Đ ($1,164)	20,000,000Đ ($892)	
Vietnam Đi tìm ẩn số	Giáng Tiên (celebrity)	September 3, 2017	100,000,000Đ ($4,400)	18,340,000Đ ($807)	75,000Đ ($3.30)	Last top prize winner before the series concluded in 2017. Second celebrity winner.

At the other end of the spectrum, in the British edition broadcast on December 7, 2009, a contestant named Corinne opened her box to reveal (and thus win) 1p, having turned down first an offer of £88,000 and then an offer to swap boxes, which would have given her the top £250,000 prize. A similar event occurred on the American version on August 25, 2008, where contestant Koshka Blackburn won $5,000 which was in her case after turning down the banker's offer of $530,000 and then the option to switch cases, which would've made her the first $1,000,000 winner. Also, in the United States on September 22, 2006, Michelle Falco kept in $750,000 and $1,000,000 in play all the way to the end, she turned down the biggest offer of $880,000 and refused to switch her case, in her case was $750,000. She also would have been the first $1,000,000 winner had she switched cases. And again, in the United States on October 22, 2008, contestant Richie Bell won $1 which was in his case after rejecting the final offer of $416,000 and the option to switch cases, which would've made him the second $1,000,000 winner. Richie also won an additional $10,000 after completing the "Banker's Challenge" minigame, thus making his total winnings $10,001. Had he had switched, he would have won $1,010,000.

Many other contestants around the world also would have won the top prize if they had swapped their box/case, or if they refused the Banker's Offer instead, which later shown that they had the top prize in their box/case all the time.

== Basis and antecedents ==
The game show has attracted attention from mathematicians, statisticians, and economists as a natural decision-making experiment. In 2008 a team of economists analyzed the decisions of people appearing in Dutch, German and U.S. episodes and found, among other things, that contestants are less risk-averse or even risk-seeking when they saw their expected winnings drop. They went so far as to say that the show, "almost appears to be an economics experiment rather than a TV show." They found that contestants behave similarly in different versions of the show, despite large differences in the amounts at stake; amounts appear to be evaluated in relative terms, for example in proportion to the initial average, and not in terms of their absolute monetary value. The research received a great deal of media attention, appearing on the front page of The Wall Street Journal and being featured on National Public Radio. This work was built upon by de Roos and Sarafidis, who analysed the Australian version of the show and determined that the risk-taking behaviour of a number of contestants would be inconsistent within each game (i.e. their aversion to risk would change), depending on the state of play and relative risk aversion of their confidant on the show.

Australian Deal or No Deal contestants are selected "on the basis of being 'outgoing', but there is no screening of contestants on the basis of their risk preferences". It is thought that other versions may screen contestants for being amicable to risk-taking behaviour.

Despite its air of originality and huge international success—there are more than 60 versions worldwide—there have been, in fact, numerous antecedents to the current run of shows. The first was the It's in the Bag, a New Zealand radio game show invented by Selwyn Toogood which began in the 1950s and which ran for decades after it was later adapted for television (1970s–90s). The show popularized the catchphrases, "By hokey," and "What will it be, customers—the money or the bag?" in New Zealand. Similarly, in the 1950s, the British TV show Take Your Pick! offered contestants the choice of taking a money offer or risking opening a box. Later, in the 1980s, The Bong Game, a radio call-in show created by UK's Capital FM, tested contestants by offering them increasing returns in tandem with increasing risk.

Another long-running game show, Let's Make a Deal, involved contestants deciding whether or not to take offers based on what may or may not be behind a curtain/door or inside a box. Let's Make a Deal ran in the U.S. for nearly three decades from 1963 to 1991, during which time Monty Hall was the program's "Big Dealer," and was revived in 2009 with Wayne Brady as the Big Dealer. Also in the U.S., in the 1970s and 1980s, was a game show called Treasure Hunt, hosted by Geoff Edwards and produced by Chuck Barris's company, which featured a similar concept to Deal or No Deal. The show featured contestants selecting a treasure chest or box with surprises inside in the hope of winning large prizes or a cash jackpot. Both game shows, however, also featured worthless or nearly-worthless joke prizes, which Let's Make a Deal called "zonks" and which Treasure Hunt called "klunks." Deal or No Deal does not feature such joke prizes in the American version but does in many international versions. Finally, from 1997 to 2003, Win Ben Stein's Money pitted contestants against an in-house adversary.

== Methodology used by "The Bank" ==
Several theories concern the methodology "The Bank" uses to determine the appropriate bank offer. This is a secret held by the various publishers around the world, however several people have approximated the algorithm with various levels of accuracy.

Statistical studies of the American version of the show were undertaken by Daniel Shifflet in 2011 and showed a linear regression of bank offers against expected value. In summary, Shifflet found that in the syndicated 30-minute version of the show the bank would offer a percentage of the expected value (EV) of the remaining cases, and this percentage increased linearly from approximately 37% of EV at the first offer to approximately 84% of EV at the seventh offer. This version of the program also allowed players to 'hypothetically' play out the remainder of the game from the point where they accepted the bank's offer, and Shiffler noted that the hypothetical bank offers were significantly higher than real bank offers at equivalent points in the game.

== Video games ==
- Innovative Concepts in Entertainment developed an arcade redemption adaptation of the show, where instead of prize money, players could win tickets.
- The British version of Deal or No Deal was converted into a mobile game by Gameloft and featured the same rules and format as the TV show. The game was so well-received that versions of it were developed for other countries as well. Its international success landed it on the top-sellers list.
- Affari tuoi, the Italian version of the format, was converted into a videogame for the Nintendo DS by the same name.
- Almost all major formats of the game were converted into games for various gaming consoles, the PC, Macromedia Flash, and even a dedicated electronic handheld game.
- Various online gambling and gaming sites have adapted the Deal or No Deal concept for their games.

== Online gambling ==
The Deal or No Deal television game show, based on the original Dutch Miljoenenjacht (Hunt for Millions), was introduced to the world by Endemol. The popular format, which requires the contestant to choose from 26 boxes or cases to reveal cash values, grew in popularity and eventually made its way into the online gambling industry as a result of the 2009 partnership between Playtech's Virtue Fusion and Endemol Games.

Online Bingo licensees of Virtue Fusion, previously acquired by Playtech, introduced DOND themed 75-ball and 90-ball rooms in addition to a slot game based on the game show, scratch cards and the launch of a new bingo brand named after the game show, Deal or No Deal Bingo.

Online gamblers experience the show's concept when securing a Full House win in the themed bingo rooms. The winner or winners enter a round of negotiations with the banker where they must make the ultimate decision, Deal or No Deal. The sense of community, often embraced by bingo players, is called upon as they assist the winner in determining the best option by commenting in the room's chat section. The Community Jackpot is divided among the Full House winner (50%) and all game participants (50%).

In February 2016, Playtech announced the renewal of its licensing agreement with Endemol UK, which will see the availability of DOND licensed online products continue for an additional three years. Under this contract, Playtech is granted exclusive rights to deliver these themed games to the UK market.

The range of DOND games are available at Virtue Fusion powered bingo brands such as bet365, Gala Bingo, Ladbrokes, Mecca Bingo and William Hill.

== See also ==
- Game Theory Analysis of Deal or No Deal
- List of international television show franchises
