= Take Me Out =

Take Me Out may refer to:

- Take Me Out (play), a 2002 play by Richard Greenberg
- "Take Me Out" (song), a 2004 song by Franz Ferdinand
- "Take Me Out", a 2010 song by the band Atomic Tom
- "Take Me Out", a 2016 song by the Japanese band Scandal from Honey
- "Take Me Out!!", a 2010 song by Fear, and Loathing in Las Vegas

== TV shows ==
- Taken Out, an Australian dating game show premiering in 2008 which has produced several international versions under the name Take Me Out
  - Take Me Out (Australian game show), an Australian television dating game show that premiered in 2018
  - Take Me Out (British game show), a British dating game show hosted by Paddy McGuinness airing on ITV
  - Take Me Out Indonesia, an Indonesian dating game show aired by Indosiar
  - Take Me Out (Irish game show), an Irish television dating game show airing on TV3
  - Take Me Out (Philippine game show), a Filipino television dating game show airing on the GMA Network
  - Take Me Out (American game show), an American dating game show airing on Fox
  - Take Me Out (Indonesian game show), an Indonesian television dating game show airing on GTV

== See also ==
- Take Me Out to the Ball Game (disambiguation)
