= Take Me Out (Australian game show) =

- Presented by: Joel Creasey
- Country of origin: Australia
- Original language: English
- No. of seasons: 1
- No. of episodes: 8

Production
- Executive producer: Digby Mitchell
- Producer: James Collins
- Production locations: Sydney, New South Wales
- Running time: 50 minutes
- Production company: Fremantle Australia

Original release
- Network: Seven Network
- Release: 3 September – 27 November 2018

Related
- Taken Out

Take Me Out was an Australian television dating game show hosted by Joel Creasey and premiered on the Seven Network from 3 September 2018 until 27 November 2018. The show was filmed at Fox Studios Australia.

Take Me Out is essentially based on the same format as Taken Out, a 2008 dating game show developed by FremantleMedia and hosted by James Kerley. International versions of the show began screening in Denmark as Dagens Mand (Today's Man) from 2008, with the Netherlands the first country to use the title "Take Me Out" in 2009. Other successful versions have screened in the United Kingdom and Ireland.

In June 2019, the series was cancelled and would not return for a second season.

== Format ==
The objective of the show is for a single man to obtain a date with one of thirty single women. The women stand on stage underneath thirty white lights, each with a button in front of them. A single man is then brought on stage and tries to persuade the women to agree to a date in a series of rounds, playing a pre-recorded video discussing his background, displaying a skill (such as dancing or playing a musical instrument), or playing another video in which the man's friends or family reveal more about his virtues and philosophy.

At any point during the rounds, the women can press the button in front of them to turn off their light if they do not believe a date with this man would be constructive to their well-being and if this occurs, their area of the stage will turn red. If, at the end of three rounds, there are lights still left on, the bachelor will turn off all but two remaining lights. He will then have a chance to ask one question to the last two women, before choosing which woman he wants to go on the date with by turning off one more light.

Alternatively, if the man had been left with two lights at the end of round 3, he will just ask his question to the two remaining women but if there is only one light left at the end of round 3, he will go on the date with that girl without asking her his question. If all the women turn off their lights before the end of the third round - this is referred to as a blackout - then the man must leave the show without going on a date.

== Cast ==
=== Flirty Thirty ===
Name	Age	Residence	Occupation	First Appearance
Kylie Mann	22	Perth	Former Miss West Coast finalist	Episode 1
Rachel Alizzi	34	Sydney	Unknown	Episode 1
Ritu Chhina	22	Sydney	Unknown	Episode 1
Brooke Ford	27	Melbourne	Unknown	Episode 1
Imogen Ewan	Unknown	Gold Coast	Unknown	Episode 1
Rhiannon Bosma	Unknown	Sydney	Unknown	Episode 1
Shania Perrett	Unknown	Unknown	Unknown	Episode 1
Aria Giannini	24	Sydney	Unknown	Episode 1
Abbey Flanagan	22	Sydney	Unknown	Episode 1
Brigitte Rose	26	Sydney	Unknown	Episode 1
Bridie Cahill	20	Sydney	Unknown	Episode 1
Bethany Eloise	Unknown	Unknown	Unknown	Episode 1
Michaela Knoppert	Unknown	Unknown	Unknown	Episode 1
Maddison Cleo	23	Sydney	Unknown	Episode 1
Karly Reimers	25	Melbourne	Real Estate	Episode 1
Lou P Scarlett	Unknown	Darwin	Burlesque dancer	Episode 1
Mallory Sedger	22	Sydney	Unknown	Episode 1
Hanna Holmes	25	Brisbane	Unknown	Episode 1
Mikayla Gray	Unknown	India	Unknown	Episode 1
Evie Morgan	21	Perth	Unknown	Episode 1
Heloise-Laure Ruinard	30	Brisbane	Beauty sales rep	Episode 1
Megan Beddoe	Unknown	Unknown	Unknown	Episode 1
Emma Bass	21	Sydney	Unknown	Episode 1
Marisa Lamonica	34	Sydney	Actress/Model	Episode 1
Karla Gutteridge	Unknown	Unknown	Nude model	Episode 1
Sheree Crow	Unknown	Sydney	Dance teacher/choreographer	Episode 1
Jo Jo Lucia	Unknown	Unknown	Unknown	Episode 1
Amy Skorikov	21	Melbourne	Student	Episode 1
Erika Tsukita	Unknown	Unknown	Model	Episode 1
Emma Hollingsworth	Unknown	Brisbane	Indigenous Artist	Episode 1
Natasha Ladani	Unknown	Gold Coast	Psychic Healer	Episode 1
Leticia Belle Llanos	Unknown	Brisbane	Retail	Episode 1
Jazzey Rooney	21	Perth	Waitress	Episode 2
Jenni Wahonick	Unknown	Sydney	Pageant Queen	Episode 2
Lacey Landesmann	Unknown	Sydney	Wedding Planner	Episode 3
Tiffany Nicholas	Unknown	Benalla	Disability Worker	Episode 3
Steph Deane	24	Brisbane	E.R. Nurse	Episode 3
Jasmin Finka	Unknown	Unknown	Unknown	Episode 4
Claire Hayes	21	Brisbane	Cosmetic Receptionist	Episode 4
Gianna Cheung	20	Wollongong	Academic/Model/Musician	Episode 4
Emily Zganiacz	Unknown	Sydney	Make-Up Artist & Qualified Graphic Designer	Episode 5
Sam Nagle	Unknown	Sydney	Graphic Designer	Episode 5
Madz Hamilton	Unknown	Sydney	Stylist	Episode 5
Raquel Garach	Unknown	Melbourne	Real Estate Sales Admin	Episode 6
Aleks Markovic	26	Perth	Singing Teacher	Episode 6
Jarrah Bevilacqua	Unknown	Melbourne	Business Development Manager	Episode 6
Christie Hawking	Unknown	Brisbane	Uber Tech Support	Episode 7
Annisa Belonogoff	Unknown	Sydney	Comedian	Episode 7
Amy Zampetides	32	Sydney	Plus Size Model	Episode 7
Abbey	Unknown	Central Coast	Hairdresser	Episode 8
Belle	Unknown	Sydney	Make-up artist	Episode 8

=== Single Men ===
Name	Residence	Date	Result	Episodes
Troy Langridge	Bunbury	Brooke Ford	Likey	Episode 1
Harrison Luna	Adelaide	Em Hollingsworth	Likey	Episode 1
Perry	Sydney	Jo Jo Lucia	No Likey	Episode 1
Philipson Sillah	Melbourne	Abbey Flanagan	Likey	Episode 1
Matej	Sydney	Emma Bass	Likey	Episode 2
BJ McGill	Gold Coast	BLACKOUT		Episode 2
Jackson Kelly	Sydney	Bridie Cahill	Likey	Episode 2
Dylan Humphries	Tasmania	Shania Perrett	Likey	Episode 3
Sebastian Andreasen	Sydney	Maddison Cleo	Likey	Episode 3
Josh	Melbourne	Bethany Eloise	No Likey	Episode 3
Rutendo Mahachi	Sydney	Marisa Lamonica	Likey	Episode 4
Harrison Tyler	Perth	Mikayla Gray	No Likey	Episode 4
Nelson Thane	Perth	Mallory Sedger	Likey	Episode 4
T	Gold Coast	Emily Zganiacz	No Likey	Episode 5
Dylan	Sydney	Sam Nagle	Likey	Episode 5
George Silvino	Sydney	Imogen Ewan	No Likey	Episode 5
Adam Badge	Melbourne	Lou P Scarlett	Likey	Episode 6
Rashik Mohtasin	Sydney	Ritu Chhina	Likey	Episode 6
Tim Simmons	Wollongong	Claire Hayes	Likey	Episode 6
Dan Black	Brisbane	Heather Legas	Likey	Episode 7
Ben Hetherington	Brisbane	Heloise-Laure Ruinard	Likey	Episode 7
Johnny Huynh	Melbourne	BLACKOUT		Episode 7
Toufic Saadeh	Sydney	Natasha Ladani	No Likey	Episode 8
Jorden Jennings	Sydney	Madz Hamilton	No Likey	Episode 8
Jordan	Melbourne	Rachel Alizzi	Likey	Episode 8

== Ratings ==
No.	Title	Air date	Overnight ratings		Ref(s)
No.	Title	Air date	Viewers	Rank	Ref(s)
1	Episode 1	3 September 2018	604,000	14	
2	Episode 2	4 September 2018	513,000	13	
3	Episode 3	11 September 2018	504,000	14	
4	Episode 4	18 September 2018	503,000	15	
5	Episode 5	25 September 2018	426,000	19	
6	Episode 6	16 October 2018	407,000	18	
7	Episode 7	23 October 2018	489,000	16	
8	Episode 8	27 November 2018	394,000	16	
