= Jessica Rich (designer) =

American fashion designer

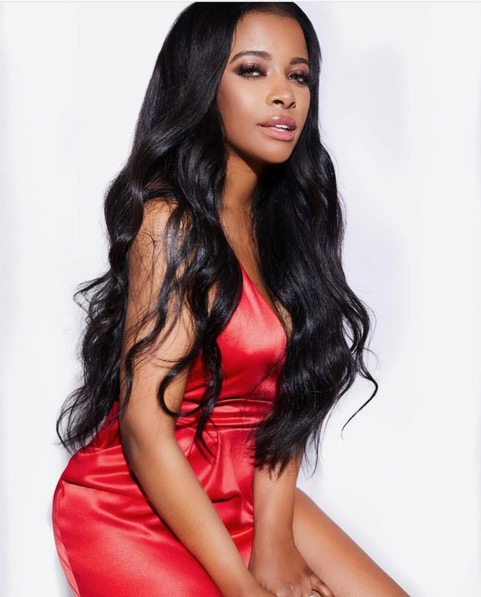
- Rich in 2018
- Born: March 13, 1984 (age 42); Grand Rapids, Michigan, United States
- Occupations: Fashion designer, actress, reality television star
- Years active: 2008-present
- Television: Real Chance of Love season 1
- Relatives: Patti LaBelle (great-aunt)

Jessica Rich, is an American fashion designer, fashion expert, actress and reality television star. She is best known for her women's shoe line; Transparent by Jessica Rich, which incorporates PVC design elements as the brands signature style. She was also a contestant on the hit VH1 celebreality series Real Chance of Love season 1 where she went by the nickname, Rabbit. Patti LaBelle is Rich's great-aunt.

== Early life ==
Rich was born and raised in Grand Rapids, Michigan. She is the daughter of Eric Willis and Janice Denise, she has four siblings. Her father was the tour and road manager for American singer and actress; Patti LaBelle, who is Rich's great-aunt.

== Television career ==
In 2008 Rich was a contestant on VH1's hit celebreality series Real Chance of Love season 1. Rich was a part of the "Chance girls", the contestants who were there to date Kamal "Chance" Givens. She was given the nickname Rabbit after Ahmad "Real" Givens likened her to an African American Jessica Rabbit. Rich would make the top three "Chance Girls" and place fifth in the competition overall, featuring in twelve episodes. In 2009 Rich was an unused alternate for the unaired, controversial season of the hit VH1 celebreality spin-off, I Love Money season 3. In 2011 Rich hosted her own web series for VH1 titled; Style it Rich. The show featured Rich finding the most inexpensive ways to look rich, she specialized in fashion makeovers and interior decorating.

Rich was a contestant in the 2012 game show, Take Me Out and in 2013 she was a contestant on the reality show The Millionaire Matchmaker.

Rich has appeared as a fashion expert on multiple daytime talk shows including; Access Hollywood, GMA3: What You Need To Know, Hollyscoop and KTLA Morning News.

Rich has also appeared in multiple films and television shows. In 2009 she made an uncredited appearance in the film Notorious. She also made an appearance in the 2010 film Salt and an appearance in the 2012 film A Beautiful Soul.

== Fashion design ==
In 2015 Rich launched The Jessica Rich Collection, a clothing line which has been worn by celebrities, musicians and reality television stars.

In late 2017 Rich debuted Transparent by Jessica Rich, her first line of women's footwear. Her signature aesthetic used in all of her collections, is the use of polyvinyl chloride (PVC) components. The material is appealing in its design versatility and ability to be worn with any color of clothing. Rich's designs most commonly styled a heel height of 120mm with a golden heel or sole. Her shoes are manufactured and purchased wholesale. Some of the footwears most notable celebrity clientele include; the Kardashian sisters, Ally Brooke, Ashanti, Bella Thorne, Blac Chyna, Cardi B, Fantasia, Halle Berry, Heidi Klum, Jelena Karleuša, Jennifer Lopez, Kesha, La La, Sasha Banks, Tamar Braxton, Tami Roman and Vanessa Simmons. Jennifer Lopez wore Rich's first shoe design, The Fancy Stiletto, to a 2018 VMA after party, paired with a skintight blouse and leggings from the Versace pre-fall 2018 collection. Lopez also wore Rich's shoes to multiple events promoting 2019 film Hustlers.

Rich's footwear collection has been featured in; E! News, Footwear News, InStyle, People, Us Weekly and Vogue.

In 2019 Rich officially launched a collection of men's footwear, focusing on an androgynous aesthetic. The collection featured American singer, songwriter and music producer Jon B. as the collections brand ambassador.

Rich's collection is sold exclusively through the company website and in select boutiques around the world. The first Jessica Rich Collection Brick-and-Mortar location opened in 2018, on Melrose Avenue in Los Angeles, California, located next to Fairfax High School. In August 2019, Rich officially announced her collection is also available in selected Macy's department stores.

== Filmography ==
=== Film and television ===
Year	Title	Role	Notes
2008	Supermodel Showdown: Costa Rica	Model	Direct to video
2008	One Word	Pool hall girl	Short film
2008	Real Chance of Love season 1	Self, contestant	5th place, 12 episodes
2009	Notorious	Party girl	Uncredited
2009	Still a Teen Movie	Rabbit	
2010	Salt	Subway passenger	Uncredited
2010	The Road To Riches	Self	Short film
2011	Sex Love and Lies	Kourtney	Short film
2011	Style it Rich	Self, host	Web series
2011	LaLa Land	Nichoelle Thomas	1 episode
2011	Nerve	Girl on toilet	
2011	After Hours: The Movie	Allison	
2012	Take Me Out	Self, contestant	2 episodes
2012	A Beautiful Soul	Club patron	
2012	The Doomsloop	Vanessa Milay	
2012	The Black Soap	Jade Jackson	
2013	The Millionaire Matchmaker	Self, contestant	1 episode
2014	Reality Relapse	Self, guest	1 episode
2014	Hollyscoop	Self, fashion expert	1 episode
2014	An American in Hollywood	Najah	
2016	KTLA Morning News	Self, guest	1 episode
2016	Access Daily	Self, guest	1 episode
2023	GMA3: What You Need To Know	Self, guest	1 episode
2025	After Hours: The Movie II	Allison	
