= The Choice (game show) =

US television program

- Genre: Dating game show Reality competition
- Presented by: Cat Deeley
- Country of origin: United States
- Original language: English
- No. of seasons: 1
- No. of episodes: 6

Production
- Executive producers: Arthur Smith; Kent Weed; Scott St. John
- Camera setup: Multi-camera
- Running time: 42 minutes
- Production companies: A. Smith & Co. Productions; Entertain the Brutes Productions

Original release
- Network: Fox
- Release: June 7 – July 12, 2012

The Choice is an American television dating game show that premiered on Fox on June 7, 2012, immediately following the premiere of Take Me Out.

== Format ==
The format of the program, which uses a format similar to the blind audition rounds of The Voice, features three stages of competition and involves four single celebrity contestants (usually male; the opposite, featuring four female celebrities, also occasionally occurs), competing to fill teams of three possible dates. The first is the blind audition, in which four contestants listen to potential dates give their first impressions while the celebrities' chairs are turned around as to not see them. Each celebrity contestant has the length of the possible suitor's time (about 30 seconds) to decide if he or she is interested in going out with that person. Each celebrity contestant must select three people to choose to be on their team (celebrities who have already selected their three potential dates still have to wait until after the contestant has finished giving their first impression to see them). The contestants turn their chairs to signify that they are interested in going out with that person; if two or more of the celebrity contestants want the same person (as happens frequently), the prospective date has the final choice of which celebrity they would be most interested in going out with.

The second phase of the competition is the speed-dating round, in which the celebrities find out more about their three potential dates. The male and female contestants are rotated to meet each other and have usually around 15 seconds to ask questions about the other person. At the end of each interval, the individual celebrity contestant's chair is turned around to signal the next two participants to start their interview. At the end of the round, each celebrity must eliminate one contestant.

The third and final round involves the two remaining contestants (who are brought out one at a time) being asked a single question, in which they give their opinion about a particular topic relating to their interests, families, or personal lives. After both contestants have given their answers, the celebrity contestant's chair is turned to allow them to make the decision about who they are most interested in dating, each celebrity then must come onstage to reveal to the host, audience, and the remaining contestants, which of the two they have chosen to go out on a date with.

== Episodes ==
Air Date	Celebrities	Contestants
June 7, 2012	Pauly D, Romeo, Jeremy Bloom, Jason Cook	
June 14, 2012	Joe Jonas, Michael Catherwood, Seth Wescott, Parker Young	Joe: Latika, Amanda & Kimberley Michael: Kerrya, Megan & Keyonna Parker: Melanie, Shannon & Becky Seth: Blaire, Morgane & Sarah Not chosen: Tina, Lindsay & Kate
June 21, 2012	Mike "The Situation" Sorrentino, Taylor Hicks, Warren Sapp, Rocco DiSpirito	Mike: Liz, Jessica & Laura Taylor: Hope, Sonya & Ruby Warren: Angela, Shakyra & Erika Rocco: Christina, Lexie & Veronica
June 28, 2012	Carmen Electra, Rima Fakih, Sophie Monk, Hope Dworaczyk	Carmen: RJ, Christopher, Nicholas Rima: Gabriel, Karim, Andrew Sophie: David, John, Shane Hope: Brant, Marco, Hermoz
July 5, 2012	Rob Kardashian, Finesse Mitchell, Rob Gronkowski, Steven Lopez	Rob K: Marjan, Kayla, Kelly Finesse: Neilda, Cassandra, Matilda Rob G: Brittany, Myrna, Elle Steven: Angelica, Monique, Diana
July 12, 2012	Dean Cain, Tyson Beckford, Robert Nettles, Ndamukong Suh	
