= Real Chance of Love season 1 =

Real Chance of Love
- Season 1
- Cast of Real Chance of Love
- Starring: Kamal Givens; Ahmad Givens
- No. of episodes: 14

Release
- Original network: VH1
- Original release: October 20, 2008 – January 26, 2009

Season chronology
- Next → Season 2

Real Chance of Love season 1 is the first season of the VH1 reality television dating series entitled Real Chance of Love. Brothers Ahmad Givens (Real) and Kamal Givens (Chance), former contestants on I Love New York, are the central figures. The show, which premiered October 20, 2008, features seventeen female contestants taking part in various challenges in a format similar to other VH1 and MTV dating contest programs. Each week, women are eliminated until the final episode where the brothers had to make their final selections. Ultimately, Ahmad selected "Corn Fed", while Kamal did not select a winner. The series consisted of 14 episodes.

== Contestants ==
Contestant nickname	Real name	Hometown	Age	Eliminated	Reason for nickname
Corn Fed	Abbi Noah	Fargo, North Dakota	25	Winner	She's from Fargo, North Dakota
Bay Bay Bay	Konanga Tyson	Modesto, California	24	Episode 12	She's from Oakland
Cali	Christine Ly	Orange County, California	23	Episode 12	She's from California
Risky	Ebony Jones	Detroit, Michigan/Atlanta, Georgia	22	Episode 12	She has a lot of tattoos on her body
Rabbit	Jessica Rich	Grand Rapids, Michigan/New York, New York	24	Episode 10	Real said she looked like a chocolate Jessica Rabbit
Milf	Ahmo Hight	Minneapolis, Minnesota/Chicago, Illinois	35–38	Episode 10	She has a 9-year-old son and hence is a milf
K.O.	Roxanne Gallegos	Oxnard, California	21	Episode 8	She has been a professional fighter for 7 years.
Bubbles	Bianca Sloof	Queens, New York	22	Episode 7	Her bubbly personality
Ki Ki	Lakia Bailey	Oakland, California	26	Episode 6	She was called Ki Ki in her neighborhood
Meatball	Angela Campanale	Italy/Chicago, Illinois	21	Episode 5	Since she was born and raised in Italy, spaghetti and meatballs was what popped up in Chance's mind
Lusty	Shonda Humphreys	Paris, Tennessee	30	Episode 4	She reminded them of a dominatrix and had a "Sister Patterson" look in her eyes.
Promo	April Oudshoorn	Spring Grove, Illinois	21	Episode 3	She works as a promoter
So Hood	Judith Scullark	Chicago, Illinois	22	Episode 3	Her feisty personality
Sexy Legs	Menika Evans	Pacoima, California	26	Episode 2	Her real nickname is "Sexy Lexi", so they went with "Sexy Legs" because of her long legs
Stalker	Lynnette Fomby	Oakland, California	26	Episode 1	She made a clock for Chance, which he strongly disliked. He was going to name her "Glue", "Contraption", "Low Budget" or "Gadget" until Real said "Stalker"
Harmony	Harmony Farhadi	Novato, California	22	Episode 1	Because she can sing well
Isha	Willesha Pollard	Arlington, Texas	24	Episode 1	Chance and Real said they know a lot of "-isha's", so she is the "Isha" of isha's

== Elimination order ==
#	Contestants	Episodes									
#	Contestants	1	2	3	4	5	6	7	8	10	12
1	Bay Bay Bay	Bay Bay Bay	Promo	Milf	Bubbles^{2}	Milf	Rabbit^{1}	Cali	Cali	Corn Fed	Corn Fed
2	Bubbles	Cali	Cali^{2}	Risky	Milf	Cali^{2}	Corn Fed^{1}	Corn Fed^{1}	Rabbit	Bay Bay Bay	Bay Bay Bay
3	Cali	Sexy Legs	K.O.	Bay Bay Bay^{1}	Cali	Corn Fed^{1}	Cali^{2}	Risky	Risky^{2}	Cali	Cali
4	Corn Fed	Rabbit	Rabbit	Rabbit^{2}	K.O.	Risky^{2}	K.O.	K.O.	Corn Fed	Risky	Risky^{*}
5	Harmony	K.O.	Milf^{1}	Ki Ki^{1}	Risky	Bay Bay Bay^{1}	Bubbles	Rabbit	Milf	Rabbit	
6	Isha	Risky	Risky	Bubbles	Corn Fed	Bubbles	Bay Bay Bay^{1}	Milf	Bay Bay Bay^{1}	Milf	
7	K.O.	Corn Fed	Bay Bay Bay	Corn Fed	Meatball	Ki Ki^{1}	Risky	Bay Bay Bay	K.O.		
8	Ki Ki	Bubbles	Bubbles^{2}	Cali	Bay Bay Bay	Rabbit	Milf^{1}	Bubbles^{2}			
9	Lusty	Milf	Ki Ki	Lusty	Rabbit	K.O.	Ki Ki				
10	Meatball	Meatball	So Hood	Meatball	Ki Ki^{1}	Meatball					
11	Milf	Ki Ki	Lusty	K.O.^{1}	Lusty						
12	Promo	Promo	Meatball	Promo							
13	Rabbit	Lusty	Corn Fed	So Hood^{2}							
14	Risky	So Hood	Sexy Legs^{1}								
15	Sexy Legs	Harmony									
16	So Hood	Isha									
17	Stalker	Stalker									

The contestant won the competition as Real's girl.
The contestant got a "R" chain from Real.
The contestant got a "C" chain from Chance.
The contestant was eliminated.
The contestant was going to receive a chain, but was eliminated.
The contestant did not receive a chain but was allowed to stay.
^{1} The contestant won a date with Real.
^{2} The contestant won a date with Chance.

- In Episode 3, So Hood was going to receive a chain from Chance, but was eliminated.
- In Episode 9 there was a cliffhanger, so the elimination was not shown until Episode 10.
- Episode 11 was a recap before the finale.
- In Episode 12, Chance did not choose anyone, although he revealed on the reunion if he had to, he'd have chosen Risky^{^*}.
- Episode 13 was a recap before the reunion.

== Episodes ==
=== Love is in the Stallion-Air ===
First aired October 20, 2008

Real and Chance are back and they're looking for love again, but this time they'll be ones doing the eliminating. The two brothers show up to find 17 lovely ladies waiting outside of their mansion. After the traditional nickname ceremony, they proceed to a back yard mixer where they get to know the girls a little better. Personalities pop and things heat up as some girls gravitate toward the sensitive brother, while others go after the hot-headed player. In the end the two brothers pick from the pool of girls, dodge-ball style until they have 7 girls each. Unfortunately for 3 girls, however, the ride is over before it begins.

— VH1 episode summary

- Bottom Five: Lusty, Harmony, So Hood, Stalker, Isha
- Eliminated: Harmony, Stalker, Isha
- Chance's Girls: Cali, Rabbit, Risky, Bubbles, Meatball, Promo, So Hood
- Real's Girls: Bay Bay Bay, Sexy Legs, K.O., Corn Fed, Milf, Ki Ki, Lusty

Episode Notes

- Ki Ki told Real that K.O. (who was there for Real) gave Chance a lap dance, but it was actually Meatball (they both had on black dresses) who gave him the lap dance.
- Stalker made a clock for Chance, which he ended up breaking. He did not like it because, it reminded him of Flavor Flav. On I Love New York, one of the reasons New York eliminated Chance is because he started to remind her of Flav.
- Bubbles and So Hood got into an argument over the way Bubbles talks. Chance did not like this at all and almost eliminated So Hood because of it.
- Lusty and Milf were the only girls to flirt with both Real and Chance at the mixer.
- Stalker and Bubbles broke one of the beds by continually jumping on it.
- Lusty was talking to herself in the mirror when the other girls were fighting. Promo caught her doing it and was creeped out.
- During elimination, Chance picked Promo to be one of his girls, and she almost denied him because she was initially more interested in Real.

Reasons For Elimination

- Stalker: Chance disliked the clock she made for him, and he did not like the way she was always following him around, and never seemed to leave him alone.
- Harmony: Chance thought her breath smelled bad, and did not have as strong of a connection with her as he did with some of the other girls.
- Isha: She did not make an effort to talk to Chance or Real and just kind of lingered in the background.

=== Don't Cross Me Bra! ===
First aired October 27, 2008

The brothers have the girls put on a county fair for them, but the one booth that Real is the most interested in, belongs to one of Chance's girls! Later on, when Chance, spying from his bedroom window, catches Real putting the moves on his woman, he decides to go after one of his brother's girls to get back at him. When the girl wants nothing to do with Chance, he makes up a lie about her to Real! Will blood prove to be thicker than the truth?

— VH1 episode summary

- Challenge winners: Bubbles, Cali, Milf, Sexy Legs
- Bottom Two: Corn Fed, Sexy Legs
- Eliminated: Sexy Legs
- Chance's Girls: Cali, Rabbit, Risky, Bubbles, So Hood, Meatball
- Real's Girls: Promo, K.O., Milf, Bay Bay Bay, Ki Ki, Lusty, Corn Fed

Episode notes

- In this week's challenge, the girls were given their own booths at the "Stallionaire Fair". The two girls from Real's side and Chance's side who had the most tickets at the end won a group date. On the date, the winners helped Chance and Real record a demo for their album.
- During elimination, Real gave his first chain to Promo. She was scared to take it at first because she thought Chance was going to get really mad. Chance was disappointed, but did not yell or get out of control.
- Since Real took Promo from him, Chance offered his first chain to Milf, but she did not want it.
- Chance and Real's younger brother Micah made an appearance.
- The girls found out that Real was the first black man Corn Fed had dated.
- Chance saw Real and Promo talking outside, so he went and started flirting with Sexy Legs. She denied him and moved away when he tried to kiss her. He felt embarrassed, so he told Real that she was trying to make moves on him.

Reasons for elimination

- Sexy Legs: Real believed Chance when he told him that Sexy Legs was trying to make moves on him. Even though nothing big really happened, he took his brother's word about it.

=== Slam, Bam, Thank You Ma'am ===
First aired November 3, 2008

Because professional wrestling is one of the Stallionaires' favorite forms of entertainment, the guys decide to have the girls put on wrestling matches. After the ladies slam and drop kick each other to the brothers' content, the winning team is taken on a date to the fishing hole. While there, one of Chance's girls proves to be "too much" sexually, getting down and dirty with him, even in front of little children and families! Things blow up on Real's side, as well, when one of his girls accuses another of being a lesbian and hitting on her. Strap in for this one!

— VH1 episode summary

- Challenge: SSA Wrestling
- Challenge Winners: K.O., So Hood, Bay Bay Bay, Ki Ki, Rabbit
- Bottom Three: K.O., Promo, So Hood
- Eliminated: Promo, So Hood
- Chance's Girls: Risky, Rabbit, Bubbles, Cali, Meatball
- Real's Girls: Milf, Bay Bay Bay, Ki Ki, Corn Fed, Lusty, K.O.

Episode Notes

- This week's challenge, the girls had to form into 3 wrestling teams and fight each other, while Chance and Real watched. The team that put on the best show, won a group date. On the date, the winners went fishing with Chance and Real.
- K.O., So Hood, Bay Bay Bay, Ki Ki and Rabbit were the Pink Team. Risky, Lusty, Corn Fed and Cali were the Grey Team. Promo, Milf, Bubbles and Meatball were the Blue Team.
- The girls were given their own wrestling names during the challenge. Corn Fed (Whiskie Dixie), Risky (1-Eyed K), Cali (Safari), Lusty (Tiki The Torturer), Bubbles (Thunder Rolls), Milf (Peace Keeper), Promo (French Tickler), Meatball (Poison Sumac), Bay Bay Bay (Cutter), K.O. (Pom Pom), Ki Ki (Miss Mystery), Rabbit (Nurse Hatchett) and So Hood (Gangsta Geisha).
- Chance and some of the girls think that K.O. is a lesbian after she seems more affectionate with other girls in the house than with Real. This led to a heated argument between Bay Bay Bay and K.O., because it was brought up during the group date.
- During the group date, Real said their brother, Micah, told him that Cali was a "industry girl".
- Lusty and Ki Ki get into a heated argument about if Ki Ki is "real" and Ki Ki talks trash about Lusty's deceased mother.
- During elimination, Chance calls So Hood down to the carpet. She thinks she is going to get her chain, but Chance actually reveals that she is a bit too much for him. So Hood is upset about it, and Chance seems a little upset about the choice he had to make, too. He gives her one last hug, and then she leaves.
- The Pink Team won the first annual SSA (Stallionaire Slam Association) heavyweight championship belt.

Reasons For Elimination

- So Hood: Chance thought she was too forward with her sexual side, and was stopping him from getting to spend time to get to know the other girls.
- Promo: Real thought she was not making a good enough effort to get to know him since she did not really come to him wanting to talk like the other girls. Chance decided not to give her another chance with him because she was a flip-flopper, and it would just be her switching from one brother to the other again.

=== Who Wants to be a Stallionaire? ===
First aired November 10, 2008

The Stallionaires are looking for a woman who can be part of the family and take care of business. When the girls arrive at the family ranch, they come to realize that their job is to restore order to a barn that is in utter chaos. Chickens, Geese, Pigs, Goats, Horses, Cows, Donkeys and even a Llama run wild, and the girls must use their ranch hand skills to regain order. Later, one of the girls shows her true crazy side and possibly buys herself a one-way ticket home.

— VH1 episode summary

- Challenge: Stallionaire Barn Yard Clean Up
- Challenge Winners: Bubbles, Ki Ki
- Bottom Two: Lusty, Ki Ki
- Eliminated: Lusty
- Chance's Girls: Bubbles, Cali, Risky, Meatball, Rabbit
- Real's Girls: Milf, K.O., Corn Fed, Bay Bay Bay, Ki Ki

Episode Notes

- This episode began with Ki Ki bullying Lusty by trashing Lusty's deceased mother. Bubbles tried to break it up. K.O. intervened, acting as though she was about to hit Ki Ki.
- In this week's challenge, the girls were paired up into teams to clean up the Stallionaire barn, and put all the animals back in their proper places. The team that did the best job, would win a group date, which consisted of a barbecue with Chance and Real.
- Meatball and Bay Bay Bay were Team 1. K.O., Cali and Lusty were Team 2. Corn Fed and Risky were Team 3. Milf and Rabbit were Team 4. Ki Ki and Bubbles were Team 5.
- Team 1's tasks were washing the pigs, putting the pigs and sheep in their stalls, and cleaning the troughs. Team 2's tasks were wrangling up the geese and turkeys back into their stalls and sweeping up the dirty hay. Team 3's tasks were washing and brushing the horses and cleaning their hooves. Team 4's tasks were stacking the hay and shoveling up the manure. Team 5's tasks were feeding the fowl, goats, sheep and pigs, putting the lambs and donkeys in their stalls, and brushing the donkey's teeth.
- Team 5 ended up winning the challenge, and were rewarded with a date with Chance and Real.
- Later in the episode, after Lusty and Milf told Real what Ki Ki said about her mother, he asked her to apologize, and she hesitated at first. After speaking with her mother over the phone, she apologized, but only to appease Real.
- Chance was told by his brother Micah that Cali was an "industry girl". When word gets back to Cali, she confronts Chance and tells him she is only in the industry because she is a make-up artist.
- Before elimination, Lusty gives Real a massage in his room. She revealed to him that her last boyfriend married another woman without telling her and jokes that she killed him because of it.
- This is the first elimination that Chance gave out his Chain first.

Reasons For Elimination

- Lusty: Real thought she was not mentally stable and was worried when she said she killed her last boyfriend, even though she claims she was joking.

=== Great Balls of Fire! ===
First aired November 17, 2008

When the guys have the girls put on a dance concert at MacArthur Park, Real, once again, becomes enamored by one of Chance's girls. Later, Real and Chance have lunch with the other brother's girls, to get to know them a little better. This proves to be the perfect time for Real to make a move on his new prospect, but what will Chance think of his brother trying to steal one of his girls again? Meanwhile, one of Chance's girls, tries to desperately to connect with him, even going so far as to make him a special meatball dinner. But when Chance gets indigestion and the romance of the moment is lost, it sends the girl into a spiral.

— VH1 episode summary

- Guest: Kaba Modern
- Challenge: Dance Competition
- Challenge winners: Corn Fed, Ki Ki, Cali, Bay Bay Bay, Risky
- Bottom Three: Rabbit, Meatball, K.O.
- Eliminated: Meatball
- Chance's Girls: Cali, Risky, Bubbles, Rabbit
- Real's Girls: Milf, Corn Fed, Bay Bay Bay, Ki Ki, K.O.

Episode notes

- In this week's challenge the girls formed teams and put on a dance competition for Chance and Real. The team that danced the best won a group date with Chance and Real, this took place at a Stallionaire concert.
- The girls picked their own team names for the competition. Corn Fed, Ki Ki, Cali, Bay Bay Bay and Risky were The Stallionettes. Milf, Meatball, Rabbit, Bubbles and K.O. were Mixed Spice.
- Chance and Real's younger brother Micah made an appearance. He performed on stage with them during the concert.
- Sun Ra (Seashell) from episode 8 of Flavor of Love: Charm School, introduced the Stallionaires to the stage.
- Some of the songs The Stallionaires performed were "Summer Luv Child" and "Life of The Party".
- Kaba Modern, from the first season of America's Best Dance Crew, help the girls practice for the challenge.
- Real and Chance have dinner with the other brother's girls to get to know them.
- Bubbles reveals during the dinner that she did not think she needed god to be a good person.
- K.O. revealed during the dinner, that she was adopted and she was sad because she did not have a family to introduce Real to.
- Real told Rabbit he was starting to have feelings for her. She felt awkward about the whole situation, but she feels that Chance has not made a connection with her. This would be the second time Real started to like one of Chance's girls, the first being Promo.
- Rabbit gave Chance swimming trunks as a gift, but it came off that he did not really care about it. She also made homemade cheesecake with Corn Fed and they gave it to Chance and Real. Chance did not really like it, and spit it out.
- Meatball made spaghetti and meatballs for Chance, but he did not like it and claims it made him sick.
- During elimination Real offered his second chain to Rabbit, after asking for Chance's approval, but she did not take it and said that she wanted to stay with Chance. Real proceeded to offer it to her two more times, but she denied him again. Chance then offered a chain to K.O., which she tearfully refused to take. K.O. was ultimately offered a chain from Real, which she accepted, grabbing the chain from him.
- Rabbit at first denied Chance's chain, because she felt like he was not showing her that he liked her, or wanted to make an effort to get to know her. He said he would make more of an effort.

Reasons for elimination

- Meatball: Chance did not feel a connection with her, like he had with the other girls.

=== From One Brother to Another ===
First aired November 24, 2008

The Stallionaires are into their cars, and the challenge of the day is to pimp out some rides for the brothers. Girls from the winning team get a private, drive-in date with the brothers, at the top of the Griffith Park. But when Real picks one of Chance's girls, the other girls and Chance are shocked. On the date, Chance becomes extremely jealous, and he continuously tries to ruin any possibility of a romantic connection between Real and the girl. Will Chance be able to talk his ex-girl back over to his side? Meanwhile, Real's girls become jealous of one woman they consider to be an old cougar, with whom Real has a strange and powerful connection. When the girls attack her, she slips with private information about Real and gets herself in hot water.

— VH1 episode summary

- Challenge: Pimp Out Rides
- Challenge Winners: Cali, Rabbit, Bay Bay Bay, Corn Fed, Milf
- Bottom Two: Milf, Ki Ki
- Eliminated: Ki Ki
- Chance's Girls: Rabbit, Cali, Bubbles, Risky
- Real's Girls: Corn Fed, K.O., Bay Bay Bay, Milf

Reason for Elimination

- Ki Ki: Real felt that Ki Ki was too vicious and did not care about hurting other people

=== Kid's Games and Old Flames ===
First aired December 1, 2008

There are eight girls left in the house and while some "love" connections are growing stronger, others have reached a standstill. But Real and Chance need a girl who has got patience and good mothering skills, so it's time to put these girls to the test and see what they're really made of. The girls are paired up with a child, whose talent they must find and nurture, for the "Mommy and Me" talent show. For one of the girls who is missing her little boy, this challenge hits a little too close to home, and it sends her into an emotional spiral. Later, one of the other girls crumbles when something from her past is exposed, leaving Chance to wonder if she is the right woman for him.

— VH1 episode summary

- Challenge: Mother Skills Challenge
- Challenge Winners: Corn Fed, Bubbles
- Bottom Four: Bubbles, Rabbit, Milf, Bay Bay Bay
- Eliminated: Bubbles
- Chance's Girls: Rabbit, Cali, Risky
- Real's Girls: Corn Fed, K.O., Bay Bay Bay, Milf

Episode Note

- Bay Bay Bay was supposed to be eliminated, but at the last second Real changed his mind and offered her an "invisible chain" which she accepted.

Reason for Elimination

- Bubbles: Bubbles admitted to Chance on their date that she was not feeling a connection to him, and that she still had feelings for someone else.

=== Ride or Die ===
First Aired December 8, 2008

The guys decide to take the girls out for a night on the town for some drinks. When a random guy hits on one of Chance's girls, he becomes irritated. A fight breaks out moments later between the brothers and the fellow, and Real breaks a bottle over the man's head. Chaos ensues, and the girls are escorted out of the bar. Nervous and crying, the girls arrive back at the house to find police officers waiting there to question them. One at a time, the girls are interrogated, but who will hold up under questioning and who will sell their man down the river?

— VH1 episode summary

- Challenge: Ride or Die Challenge
- Challenge Winners: Risky, Bay Bay Bay
- Bottom Two: Bay Bay Bay, K.O.
- Eliminated: K.O.
- Chance's Girls: Rabbit, Cali, Risky
- Real's Girls: Corn Fed, Bay Bay Bay, Milf

Reasons for Elimination

- K.O.: Real felt that she still had growing up to do, and had even stated that if she hadn't walked out of the house earlier, Bay Bay Bay would have been sent home.

=== The Parent Trap, Part I ===
First aired December 15, 2008

Now that Real and Chance have narrowed it down to three girls each, it is time to take things to the next level and meet mom and dad. The brothers enlist in their parents help, hoping to get an endorsement for their remaining ladies. And what better a place to do this than beautiful Palm Springs. But things turn ugly when a few of the girls gang up on their biggest competition, leaving mom and dad with a bad taste in their mouth rather than a great first impression. When an explosive secret is revealed, a mutiny among the girls takes things from bad to worse. To be continued ...

— VH1 episode summary

=== The Parent Trap, Part II ===
First aired December 29, 2008

Continuing on the heels of a massive fight, an angry mob of girls marches into the guys' villa, and reveals shocking information about one of the other girls. When Real comes to learn that all the trouble is coming from his favorite girl, he is forced with a tough decision and must decide whether his connection with her is strong enough to overcome the drama she causes. The following day Chance takes his ladies out on a date with the parents. Conversations get heated and the real personalities begin to appear in front of Chance's parents. Going into elimination the outcome is uncertain; one girl's relationship with both the brothers has been exposed, and another girl's aggression has surfaced. One more girl is sent home, and the four remaining girls will be off to Puerto Rico.

— VH1 episode summary

- Eliminated: Rabbit, Milf
- Chance's Girls: Cali, Risky
- Real's Girls: Corn Fed, Bay Bay Bay

Reason for eliminations

- Rabbit: Chance said he felt a better connection to Risky and Cali.
- Milf: Real thought there was too much drama surrounding Milf, and that Milf was distrustful.

=== The Clip Show ===
First aired January 5, 2009

Over the past months the lovable brothers Real and Chance have lived with 17 women in an attempt to find that special connection, but along the way was a lot of drama and heartache. As the finale in Puerto Rico is upon them, the brothers spend tonight reminiscing on their experiences, and introducing some never seen before clips in this outrageous episode.

— VH1 episode summary

=== Thunder in Paradise ===
First aired January 12, 2009

It's down to the final four and the Stallionaires are going all out. Real and Chance fly their ladies to Puerto Rico for the show's finalé, and show them the island in style. Our Stallionaires take the girls on dates by horseback through the romantic rainforest and on a multi-million dollar yacht, exploring both the island and their own hearts in a final effort to make the right choice. Real must decide if he really has chemistry with a girl that says all the right things, or will his connection with a more sensitive girl outweigh that. Meanwhile, Chance needs to figure out if he only has a purely physical connection with one girl or if the other can let her guard down. When the dust settles, who will be left standing in the final showdown with a Real Chance of love?

— VH1 episode summary

- Eliminated: Risky, Cali, Bay Bay Bay
- Chance's Girl: No One
- Real's Girl: Corn Fed

Reasons for Eliminations

- Bay Bay Bay: Real felt a stronger connection to Corn Fed
- Risky: Chance admitted that he hadn't fallen for Risky or Cali
- Cali: Chance admitted that he hadn't fallen for Cali or Risky

=== Memoirs of a Stallionaire ===
First aired January 21, 2009

Now that the world has seen the Real Chance of Love Finale, and the Stallionaire brothers have decided their fate, it is time for a no-holds-barred look back at the ultimate journey for love. Perched in their directors chairs outside of a Hollywood soundstage, just moments before heading inside the studio to shoot the Real Chance Reunion, the boys will let us in on their own personal favorites from the season — the hilarity, the drama, and the ultimate unseen moments!

— VH1 episode summary

Some of the never-before-scenes included were:

- The contestants casting tapes
- Bubbles' fascination with fruit smoothies
- Real and Chance's video diaries
- More scenes of the girls getting eliminated
- Rabbit and Corn Fed both wanting to leave the house on the same night
- Chance walking in on Real and Milf in the bedroom
- An extended preview of the reunion show

=== Reunion show ===
First aired January 26, 2009

It's been three months since Real and Chance risked it all in their quest to find true love.

On the final night in Puerto Rico, one brother chose a woman with whom he hoped to spend the rest of his life, while the other broke the hearts of two finalists, each of whom hoped that they had a Real Chance of Love with him. On the reunion show, Real, Chance and all of the women will gather to relive the highs and lows of a season that changed their lives forever. Along the way, voices will be raised; tears will be shed and Real will be reunited with his choice to see if their love has survived.

The girls are back and they all have a something to share with the guys. Will Real continue with the girl he chose or is it all over?

— VH1 episode summary

== After the show ==
- Cali (Christine Ly) and Milf (Ahmo Hight) appeared in the second season of I Love Money, where they placed 10th and 14th place respectively.
- A few days after the reunion show was taped, Corn Fed and Real ended their relationship.
- It was reported on the VH1 blog that there will be a "second season" of Real Chance of Love, with the working title Real Chance of Love 2.
- So Hood (Judith Scullark), Bay Bay Bay (Konanga Tyson), Bubbles (Bianca Sloof), Ki Ki (Lakia Bailey), Risky (Ebony Jones), and K.O. (Roxanne Gallegos) were selected to compete on the third season of Charm School hosted by Ricki Lake, which premiered on May 11, 2009, with Risky (Ebony Jones) being the winner.
- Rabbit (Jessica Rich) made a cameo appearance in the Method Man & Redman video for "Mrs. International".
- Bubbles (Bianca Sloof) was a contestant on the canceled third season of I Love Money, where it is believed she came in 3rd place.
- Corn Fed (Abbi Noah) appeared on the fourth season of I Love Money, where she came in 8th place.
- Ahmed Givens (Real) died on February 20, 2015, after a long battle of colon cancer. He was 33.
- Kamal Givens (Chance) was given a new dating series entitled "One Mo' Chance" on The Zeus Network.
- So Hood (Judith Scullark) appeared on the 7th Season of Love & Hip Hop: New York under "J. Adrienne" as Snoop's girlfriend.
- Milf (Ahmo Hight) died on August 29, 2023.
