= Taken Out =

- Genre: Comedy; Dating game show
- Developed by: FremantleMedia Australia
- Presented by: James Kerley
- Opening theme: "I Never Liked You" by Rogue Traders
- Country of origin: Australia
- Original language: English
- No. of seasons: 1
- No. of episodes: 65

Production
- Running time: 30 minutes
- Production company: FremantleMedia Australia

Original release
- Network: Network Ten
- Release: 1 September 2008 – 26 February 2009

Related
- Take Me Out

Taken Out is an Australian television dating game show that was originally broadcast on Network Ten between 1 September 2008 and 26 February 2009. The format was developed by FremantleMedia (now Fremantle) and was hosted by James Kerley.

International versions were developed using various titles, starting in 2008 in Denmark as Dagens Mand (Today's Man) and in 2009 in the Netherlands as Take Me Out. This title was also used for the British, Irish, Philippine and the American versions of the show. A rebooted Australian version, renamed to Take Me Out, hosted by comedian Joel Creasey, aired on the Seven Network from 3 September until 27 November 2018.

Versions have also been made in Sweden, Indonesia, Japan, China, Spain, Finland, Thailand, Germany, Italy, France, Malaysia, Taiwan, Canada (Quebec), Vietnam and Lebanon.

== Format ==
Taken Out is primarily a studio-based show, with limited amounts of on-location filming, that involves a single person being introduced to thirty single people of the opposite gender which are revealed to them in the Taken Out arena. The show is split into two sections: The initial selection in the studio, and the two stage date. During the course of the game, the host presents information and videos about the single person and based upon this information, the thirty people periodically decide independently, if they should 'leave their light on' and stay in the game with the chance to date the single person or to 'turn their light out' and exclude themselves.

=== Initial selection ===
Note: The following describes the game process with one single man being presented to thirty single women. The opposite (one single woman presented to thirty single men) also occurs.

Firstly, the women learnt a single piece of information about the single man which, along with his appearance, they used to decide whether they were interested or not. The women then judge and turn their lights off or keep them on, however if they turn their lights off, they can't change their minds later on. Next up, a video profile of the single man is shown, where they describe their best features and qualities to try to keep as many women in the game as possible. The women then judged again. After, a video by the single man's friend, family member, co worker or ex-partner is shown. The women then decide again. Finally, if there are four or more women left with their lights on, the single man walks around the arena and personally meets each remaining woman and either turns her light out or leaves hers on until there are only three women remaining. Then the single man asks a question to the three women, in which he then chooses one woman to dismiss. This occurs again for the remaining two women. At the end, the single man formally gets asked if they would like to date the remaining woman or to decline the opportunity. The first question is skipped if only two women are remaining and the single man still gets to ask a question if only one woman remains before arriving at the question stage. If at any stage of the game all thirty women turn their lights off, the game ends immediately and the single man leaves the show without a woman. During the whole process Kerley walks around the arena and chats with the women asking for their opinions of the single man and why they had kept their light on or turned it off.

=== Dating process ===
After the initial selection is complete, a three-stage dating process occurs. Firstly, the couple get to chat in private in a 'green room' at the studios in which they can get to know each other better in an uninfluenced environment. Next up, the couple meet for a date at a Melbourne restaurant, bar, massage parlour or other similar place. If either person is still interested in the other, there is an opportunity to attend a rendezvous at the Eureka Tower observation deck, where champagne and views of Melbourne at night await. This can often embarrassingly lead to only one person attending the rendezvous point. The latter two meetings are optional, however most attend the second stage. After all possible meetings, a final verdict is delivered. If either person wants the relationship to continue, they 'leave their light on' but if they wish for the relationship to end, they 'turn their light out'. This process is shown on the following episode, after the pairing was determined.

== Broadcast ==
The show originally screened Monday to Friday in the 7pm timeslot before it was moved to an earlier 6pm timeslot after two weeks on air, due to competition from other shows. It was removed from schedules in its fourth week after screening 19 episodes, due to continuing mediocre ratings. Despite the axing, FremantleMedia continued to produce new episodes. In total, 65 episodes had been recorded. On 12 January 2009, Taken Out returned to air at around midnight each morning, seven days a week. The remaining 46 episodes aired until 26 February 2009.

The show has also aired on Australian subscription television channel Channel V.

== International versions ==
Region/Country	Name	Channel	Premiere	Presenter(s)
Australia (Original format)	Take Me Out	Seven Network	3 September – 27 November 2018	Joel Creasey
Belgium (Flanders)	Take Me Out	2BE	15 December 2010 – 2011	Gerrit De Cock
Brazil	Me Leva Contigo; Take Me With You	Rede Record	9 May 2014 – 2015	Rafael Cortez
Chile	Elígeme; Pick Me	Mega	24 March 2010 – 9 February 2011	Luis Jara
China	我们约会吧 (male/female roles reverse) "Let's Date" 我们约会吧	Hunan TV	24 December 2009 – 25 June 2014	He Jiong (何炅)
China	非诚勿扰; If You Are the One; Literally "If not Sincere, Then Don't Bother"	Jiangsu TV	15 January 2010 – present	Meng Fei (孟非)
Czech Republic	Take Me Out	Prima televize	14 September 2017 – present	Jakub Prachař and Milan Zimnýkoval
Denmark	Dagens Mand; Today's Man	TV2	17 September 2008	Pelle Hvenegaard
Denmark	Dagens Mand; Today's Man	TV3	8 September 2016	Mattias Hundebøll
Estonia	Vali Mind! Pick Me!	Kanal 2	2011	Kristjan Jõekalda
France	Séduis-moi...Si tu peux! Seduce me...if you can!	W9	30 September 2013	Jérôme Anthony
Germany	Take Me Out	RTL	13 March 2013 – present	Ralf Schmitz; Jan Köppen; Chris Tall
Hungary	Vigyél el! Take Me Away!	RTL Klub	5 September 2015	Bence Istenes
Indonesia	Take Me Out Indonesia	Indosiar	19 June 2009; 17 November 2012	Choky Sitohang and Yuanita Christiani
Indonesia	Take Him Out Indonesia	Indosiar	2 August 2009	Choky Sitohang and Yuanita Christiani
Indonesia	Take A Celebrity Out Indonesia	Indosiar	2010	Choky Sitohang and Yuanita Christiani
Indonesia	All New Take Me Out Indonesia	Indosiar	February 2014	Indra Bekti and Nycta Gina
Indonesia	Take Me Out Indonesia	antv	19 September 2016	Eko Patrio
Indonesia	Cari Jodoh Lagi; Find a Soulmate Again	antv	20 August 2017	Eko Patrio
Indonesia	Take Me Out Indonesia	GTV	27 July 2019 – 2020	Robby Purba
Indonesia	Take Me Out Indonesia	MNCTV	29 June 2023 – 10 November 2024	Rian Ibram, Angel Karamoy and Vega Darwanti
Ireland	Take Me Out	TV3	15 October 2010 – 4 April 2015	Ray Foley
Italy	Take me out - Esci con me Take me out - Go out with me	Real Time	4 January 2016 – 2019	Gabriele Corsi; Katia Follesa
Japan	Take Me Out	TBS TV	1 October 2009	加藤浩次; Kato Kouji
Lebanon	Take Me Out نقشت; Take Me Out, it worked	LBCI	8 September 2016 – present	Fouad Yammine
Malaysia	Take Me Out	NTV7	11 November 2011	Nazrudin Rahman and Julie Woon
Netherlands	Take Me Out	RTL 5	9 March 2009	Eddy Zoëy/Jan Kooijman
Netherlands	Take me Out Mother knows best	Videoland	2021 – present	Rick Brandsteder
Norway	Dagens Mann; Man of The Day	TV3	September 2011 – 2013	Hasse Hope
Philippines	Take Me Out	GMA Network	26 April – 2 July 2010	Jay-R
Poland	Umów się ze mną. Take Me Out; Make an Appointment/Arrange with me. Take Me Out	Polsat	7 March 2018	Piotr Gumulec
Québec (Canada)	Allume-moi; Light me up	V	30 September 2013 – 2014	Philippe Bond
Romania	Rămân cu tine I Remain/Stay/Staying with You	Antena 1	4 August 2020	Liviu Vârciu
Serbia	Izvedi me (Take me out); Bring me (Take me out)	RTV Pink	21 November 2016 – 1 January 2018	Andrija Milošević
Slovakia	Take Me Out	TV JOJ	5 September 2017 – 2019	Milan Zimnýkoval and Jakub Prachar
South Africa	Take Me Out: South Africa	SABC1	15 July 2014	Phat Joe (NOTE: This should not be confused with a rapper named "Fat Joe")
South Africa	Take Me Out: Mzansi	Vuzu Amp	10 July 2017 – 2018	Phat Joe (NOTE: This should not be confused with a rapper named "Fat Joe")
South Korea	Love Switch	tvN	15 March 2010 – 2011	Lee Kyung-kyu and Shin Dong-yup
Spain	Elígeme; Pick Me	Cuatro	24 November 2010 – 2011	Carlos Baute
Spain	Me quedo contigo I Stay with You	Telecinco	25 July – 22 November 2019	Jesús Vázquez
Sweden	Dagens man Today's Man	TV4 Plus	30 September 2009 – 9 July 2010	Carolina Gynning
Taiwan	王子的約會; Take Me Out Taiwan	Taiwan Television	18 August 2012 – 26 April 2014	Harlem Yu and Ella Chen of (S.H.E)
Thailand	Take Me Out Thailand	Channel 3	2 July 2011 – present	Patcharasri Benjamas; Ketsepsawat Palagawongse na Ayutthaya and Apissada Kueakhongkha
Thailand	Take Guy Out Thailand	AIS Play; Line TV	7 May 2016 – present	Patcharasri Benjamas; Ketsepsawat Palagawongse na Ayutthaya and Niti Chaichitathorn
Ukraine	Давай, до побачення! Davay, do pobachennya! Come on, goodbye!	1+1	30 August 2012	Andriy Domanskyi
United Kingdom	Take Me Out	ITV	2 January 2010 – 28 December 2019	Paddy McGuinness
United States	Take Me Out	Fox	7 June – 26 July 2012	George Lopez
Vietnam	Đăng nhập trái tim Login Heart	HTV7	8 May 2021	Phương Hiếu; Âu Việt
