= Fremantle Australia =

Australian production and entertainment company

Fremantle Australia Pty Ltd.
- Logo used since 2018
- Formerly: FremantleMedia Australia (2006–2018)
- Type: Subsidiary
- Industry: Television
- Predecessors: Grundy Television; Crackerjack Productions
- Founded: 2006; 20 years ago
- Headquarters: Sydney, New South Wales, Australia
- Key people: Greg Woods (Chief Executive Officer)
- Parent: Fremantle
- Website: www.fremantleaustralia.com

Fremantle Australia Pty Ltd. (formerly FremantleMedia Australia) is the Australian arm of global British production and entertainment company Fremantle. It was formed in 2006 by the merger of market leader Grundy Television and comedy specialists Crackerjack Productions, which had both been acquired previously by Fremantle.

== History ==
=== Grundy ===
Grundy Television (founded as Reg Grundy Enterprises) was founded by Reg Grundy. Its first production, Wheel of Fortune in 1959, was an original idea devised by Grundy for a radio game show, before he took the idea to Sydney television network TCN9 (now part of the Nine Network). The then 36-year-old worked both as the show's producer and host.

With the show becoming a success, Grundy realized that US network television could serve as a ready source of new quiz show ideas. He began visiting America to spot attractive formats for adapting and remaking back in Australia. It is often said that Reg Grundy was the world's first TV format producer, and the only 'format mogul' to have originated out of Australia. The formation of a licensing entity Reg Grundy Enterprises and Grundy International Distribution set the normal operating system for many production houses worldwide.

Grundy grew to become the largest privately owned Australian producer and distributor of television programmes both domestically and internationally. Realising that in order for Grundy's to thrive, the company diversified from solely producing game shows to making serial drama, telemovies and children's fiction. The company hired Reg Watson to run its dramas in 1974, starting with Class of '74.

Grundy's first success in the serial drama genre came during the 1970s with The Young Doctors (1976), The Restless Years (1977) and Prisoner, which grew into a worldwide cult hit from its launch in 1979. When it was sold to US broadcaster, KTLA, in August 1979, it was such a success, that Prisoner: Cell Block H (as it was known in the US and UK) was syndicated to over 30 local TV stations, and remained popular until around 1982. It began in the UK in 1984 and went on to become a cult hit there.

In 1976, the company set up a licensing agreement with Goodson-Todman Productions where Grundy made its option on Goodson-Todman properties outside of the United States and continental Europe, and later gaining exclusive rights for markets outside the US and Europe in 1992.

With Grundy cementing its production dominance in Australia, a US Grundy office was set up in 1979 to sell programming to the American networks. One of the most successful format sales was Sale of the Century—originally a US format—that Reg had produced in Australia and then purchased the rights outright.

As Grundy's grew and set up its presence around the world—particularly in Britain—the company was named Grundy Worldwide Limited, outside Australia and the Grundy Organisation locally.

=== Neighbours ===
With a string of hits and format deals around the world, including the 80s hit soap opera, Sons and Daughters (1982), another of Grundy's television legacies is the long-running serial drama, Neighbours. First commissioned and broadcast by 7 Network in 1985, following its cancellation after just seven months, it was picked up and aired on Network 10 from January 1986 to November 2010 and then its digital channel 11 (later 10 Peach) from January 2011. Neighbours was a much bigger hit in the UK than Australia, and in the 1980s and early 90s, it was achieving viewing figures of up to 20 million on the BBC. It originally ran as "cheap daytime filler" at lunchtimes, with a repeat the following morning, however, a timeslot change to an early evening repeat, saw viewing figures treble. By 2007, ratings had eroded somewhat, but it remained the highest-rated daytime drama series in the UK, with audiences over three million viewers. The BBC dropped Neighbours after refusing to sign a new ten year contract with Fremantle, valued at over 300 million GBP - three times the fee they paid previously. As a consequence, the BBC walked away from negotiations, and the series moved to commercial broadcaster, Channel 5, from Monday, 11 February 2008.

In 2011, Channel 5 became Neighbours key production partner following Ten's decision to move the series to their new digital channel (then called "11") and therefore, reduce their financial stake in its production costs. Neighbours was the highest-rated daytime show for the broadcaster for several years, however, changing viewer habits and demographics saw Channel 5 renegotiate their contract with Fremantle. In 2017, a new four-year deal was agreed which increased the number of episodes produced to all year round (from 240 episodes to 258) and episodes were broadcast in Australia and the UK on the same day, in a bid to prevent new episodes leaking to online streaming services. The full effect of this strategy was unrealised however, when Channel 5 dropped down to showing only two weekly episodes during the COVID-19 pandemic, therefore, putting the UK behind Australia once again and this situation was never resolved - UK broadcasts then overtook Australia when 10 Peach reduced their output to four weekly episodes, whilst Channel 5 carried on airing five. In June 2021, only a one-year extension to this deal was granted, but in February 2022, Channel 5 finally decided not to renew their contract with Fremantle. With no other broadcaster willing to produce Neighbours, the series official cancellation was announced in March, and came to an end on Thursday, 28 July 2022 (Friday, 29 July in Britain), after 37 years of production. In November 2022, it was announced that the show would be revived by Amazon Freevee and Fremantle and would being airing in 2023.

=== Pearson takeover of Grundy ===
On 26 March 1995, a deal was signed in London between Reg Grundy and global entertainment company Pearson Television to acquire Grundy Worldwide. The Australian branch of the company remained with its roots and was called Grundy Television from 1995 to 2006, when it eventually took on the rebranded company name FremantleMedia Australia.

In April 2000, Pearson Television merged with CLT-UFA to create RTL Group, a broadcast, content and digital producer. In August 2001, Pearson Television changed its name to FremantleMedia for the content production division of RTL Group and in December of that year Pearson Television's holding company, Pearson plc, sold its stake in RTL Group to the German-based Bertelsmann Group, which is one of the world's largest media companies.

FremantleMedia logo from 2006 to 2018

In 2003, FremantleMedia acquired Crackerjack Productions and in 2006 FremantleMedia merged both the Australian production companies, Grundy and Crackerjack, and formed FremantleMedia Australia.

=== Crackerjack Productions ===
Crackerjack Productions was an independent television production company headed by brothers Mark and Carl Fennessy. Based in St Leonards, Sydney, it concentrated on comedy-related projects, with forays into light entertainment, music, factual and reality television. It was partially acquired by Fremantle in 2003 and in 2006 was merged with Grundy Television to form Fremantle Australia.

==== CP productions ====
Crackerjack productions included:

- CNNNN
- The Chaser election specials
- Comedy Inc.
- The Biggest Loser Australia
- Australia's Brainiest
- So Fresh
- Newstopia
- The King
- Quizmania

==== CP controversies ====
It was reported in August 2002 that the Federal Court in Sydney had ruled that Crackerjack had "misled job seekers about the availability of work offered by it while making a reality television program for Network 10".

=== Fremantle ===
In 2011, Spring, a content creation division of the company was established.

Some of FremantleMedia Australia's productions include: Australian Idol, Family Feud, The Great Australian Bake Off (season 2), Grand Designs Australia, Australia's Got Talent, The X Factor and The Farmer Wants a Wife and original dramas such as Wentworth, Neighbours, Hoges: The Paul Hogan Story, Mary: The Making of a Princess, Wonderland and Better Man. FremantleMedia also produced the drama Picnic at Hanging Rock. FremantleMedia Australia also brought adaptations of US programmes to Australia including: MasterChef Australia, The Biggest Loser and So You Think You Can Dance.

Since Jennifer Mullin (former chief of North American unit) became the company's new CEO for International in September, in the same month the company introduced a new logo identifying it simply as "Fremantle" ("Fremantle Australia" in Australia).

In 2018, Fremantle reached an agreement with Israeli company Keshet International for rights to produce adaptations of its non-scripted formats in Australia and New Zealand.

In 2021, Fremantle acquired a majority stake in Eureka Productions, an Australian-American studio focusing on non-scripted programming. With a 2022 restructuring of Fremantle Australia to focus on dramas, documentaries, and factual content, Eureka was placed in charge of Fremantle's non-scripted and entertainment formats in the country.

== Current programmes ==
- Australian Idol (Network 10, 2003–2009; Seven Network, 2023–present)
- Australia's Got Talent (Seven Network, 2007–2012; Nine Network, 2013, 2015; Seven Network, 2019, 2022–present)
- Bay of Fires (ABC, 2023–present)
- The Farmer Wants a Wife (Nine Network, 2007–2012, 2016; Seven Network, 2022–present)
- Grand Designs Australia (LifeStyle Channel/Foxtel, 2011–present)
- The Great Australian Bake Off (LifeStyle Channel/Foxtel, 2015–present)
- Heartbreak High (Netflix, 2022–2025)
- Picnic at Hanging Rock (Showcase/Foxtel, 2018)
- The PM's Daughter (ABC Me, 2022–present)
- Rock Island Mysteries (Network Ten, 2022–present)
- Shortland Street (TVNZ 2, 1992–present)
- Take Me Out (formerly Taken Out) (Seven Network, 2018–present)
- Wellmania (Netflix, 2023–present)

== Former programmes ==
- The Apprentice Australia (Nine Network, 2009)
- 2010 ARIA Awards (Network 10, 2010)
- As the Bell Rings (Disney Channel/Foxtel, 2007–2011)
- Australia's Brainiest (Seven Network, 2004; Network 10 2005–2006)
- Australia's Most Wanted (Seven Network, 1989–1999)
- BackBerner (ABC1, 1999–2002)
- Barons (ABC, 2022)
- Beat the Odds (Seven Network, 1971–1972)
- Bellamy (Network 10, 1981)
- Bert's Family Feud (Nine Network, 2006–2007)
- The Biggest Loser Australia (Network 10, 2006–2010) (the production moved to Endemol Shine Australia, 2011–present)
- Blankety Blanks (Network 10, 1977–1978; Nine Network, 1986-1986 and 1996–1997)
- Case for the Defence (1978)
- Casino 10 (Network 10, 1975–1977)
- The Celebrity Apprentice Australia (Nine Network, 2011–2015)
- Celebrity Name Game (Network 10, 2019–2020)
- Class of '74 (Seven Network, 1974–1975)
- The Chaser Decides (ABC1, 2001)
- Chopper Squad (Network 10, 1976–1979)
- CNNNN (ABC1, 2002–2003)
- Comedy Inc. (Nine Network, 2003–2007)
- Comedy Slapdown (The Comedy Channel/Foxtel, 2008)
- Double Take (Seven Network, 2009)
- Escape of the Artful Dodger (Nine Network, 2001)
- Everybody Dance Now (Network 10, 2012)
- Excess Baggage (Nine Network/Go!, 2012)
- Family Feud Australia (Nine Network, 1977–1984; Seven Network, 1988–1996; Network 10, 2014–2018)
- Family Feud New Zealand (TV3, 2016–2017)
- The Gift (2007–2009)
- Glenview High (Seven Network, 1977–1979)
- Great Temptation (Seven Network, 1970–1974)
- Hoges: The Paul Hogan Story (Seven Network, 2017)
- Hot Streak (Seven Network, 1998)
- Inside the Sydney Opera House (ABC, 2022)
- I Own Australia's Best Home (LifeStyle Channel/Foxtel, 2016)
- It's a Knockout (Network 10, 1985–1987, 2011–2012)
- Keynotes (Nine Network, 1992–1993)
- The King (TV1/Foxtel and Nine Network, 2007 Telemovie)
- King's Men (Nine Network, 1976)
- Man O Man (Seven Network, 1994)
- Mary: The Making of a Princess (Network 10, 2015)
- MasterChef Australia (Network 10, 2009–2011) (the production moved to Endemol Shine Australia, 2012–present)
- Match Mates (Nine Network, 1981–1982)
- Mission Top Secret (Network 10, 1992–1995)
- The Mole (Seven Network, 2013)
- Mr & Mrs Murder (Network 10, 2013)
- Neighbours (Seven Network, 1985; Network 10, 1986–2010, 2022–2025; 10 Peach, 2011–2022; Amazon Freevee, 2023–2025)
- Nerds FC (SBS, 2006–2007)
- New Zealand Idol (TV2, 2004–2006)
- Newstopia (SBS, 2007–2008)
- Perfect Match (Australia) (Network 10, 1984–1989)
- Perfect Match (New Zealand) (TV3, 1989–1990)
- Possession (Nine Network, 1989)
- The Price Is Right (1957-1974 Australian game show) (Seven Network, 1963; Network 10 1973–1974)
- The Price Is Right (Australian game show) (Seven Network, 1981–1986 and 2012; Network 10, 1989; Nine Network, 1993–1998 and 2003–2005)
- Prisoner (Network 10, 1979–1986)
- Project Runway Australia (Arena/Foxtel, 2008–2012)
- Quizmania (Nine Network, 2006–2007)
- Ready for Takeoff (Nine Network, 2015–2016)
- Richmond Hill (Network 10, 1988)
- $ale of the Century (Australia) (Nine Network, 1980–2001)
- $ale of the Century (New Zealand) (TV ONE, 1989–1993; TV3, 1995)
- Schapelle (Nine Network, 2014)
- Second Chance (Network 10, 1977)
- Secret Valley (ABC1, 1984)
- Significant Others (ABC, 2022)
- Silvia's Italian Table (ABC, 2016)
- So Fresh (Nine Network, 2002–2006)
- So You Think You Can Dance Australia (Network 10, 2008–2010)
- Sons and Daughters (Seven Network, 1982–1987)
- Supermarket Sweep (Nine Network, 1994–1996)
- Taken Out (Network 10, 2008–2009) (changed to Take Me Out and moved to Seven Network, 2018–present)
- Temptation (Nine Network, 2005–2009)
- The Restless Years (Network 10, 1977–1982)
- The Young Doctors (Nine Network, 1976–1983)
- Three on a Match (Seven Network, 1975)
- Ultimate School Musical (Fox8/Foxtel, 2008)
- Until Tomorrow (Seven Network, 1975)
- Wheel of Fortune (Australia) (Seven Network, 1981–2006)
- Wheel of Fortune (New Zealand) (TV2, 1991–1996)
- Who Wants to Be a Millionaire? (Nine Network, 1999–2001)
- Wentworth (Showcase/Foxtel, 2013–2021)
- Wonderland (Network 10, 2013–2015)
- The X Factor (Australia) (Network 10, 2005; Seven Network, 2010–2016)
- The X Factor (New Zealand) (TV3, 2013–2015)

== Digital media ==
- Nacho's Road Trip (2010)
- Macca's Chef (2010)
- MySpace Road Tour (2008)
- Australian Idol Online (2006–2009)
- So You Think You Can Dance Australia Online (2008–2010)
- The Biggest Loser Australia Online (2008–2010)
- Nerds FC Online (2006–2007)
- The Movie Show Online (2007)
- The Farmer Wants a Wife Online (2007–present)
- The X Factor Online (2010 – present)
- Australia's Got Talent Online (2007–present)
