= Take Me Out Indonesia =

- Genre: Reality television
- Developed by: Fremantle
- Presented by: Rian Ibram (2023-present); Angel Karamoy (2023-present); Vega Darwanti (2023-present); Robby Purba (2019-2020); Raffi Ahmad (2016-2017); Eko Patrio (2016-2017); Indra Bekti (2014); Nycta Gina (2014); Choky Sitohang (2009-2010, 2012-2014); Yuanita Christiani (2009-2014); Rizal Syahdan (2010)
- Opening theme: "What a Man" by Salt-N-Pepa (2009-2011 only)
- Ending theme: Jomblowati/Single Women by SHE
- Country of origin: Indonesia
- No. of seasons: 6

Production
- Producers: Devi Anggrainy; Virgita Ruchiman; Yosie
- Production locations: Dome Ancol, Jakarta (2009-2014); ANTV Epicentrum Studio Complex, Jakarta (2016-2017); MNC Studios, Jakarta (2019-2024)
- Running time: 120 minutes (90 minutes since 3rd seasons)
- Production companies: Fremantle

Original release
- Network: Indosiar (2009-2014) antv (2016-2017); GTV (2019-2020, 2026-present); MNCTV (2023-2024); RCTI (Note: Only reruns via MNCTV.) (2025)
- Release: June 19, 2009 – present

Related
- Famili 100 (antv/Indosiar/TV7/tvOne/GTV/MNCTV); Indonesia's Got Talent (Indosiar/SCTV/RCTI)

Take Me Out Indonesia is reality show based on the format of Taken Out and aired by Indosiar from the date of June 19, 2009 until June 30, 2013, then aired by antv from September 19, 2016, until August 27, 2017, GTV from July 27, 2019, until March 26, 2020, and MNCTV from June 29, 2023, until November 10, 2024.

Take Me Out Indonesia is a search-themed event and broadcast partner for 2 hours (90 minutes since the 3rd). In this event, the 30 single women standing behind the podium pick 7 single men, introduced one by one. In 2016, the show is back again but this time is shown on antv because a TV station which is usually a TMOI broadcasting rights for approximately 4 years (2009–2013), Indosiar choose to stop contracts and chose to focus on the program "dangdut". In 2019, the show is back again but this time is shown on GTV because some of Fremantle's TV show that aired on this channel due to the cooperation between them. Due to the COVID-19 pandemic, the GTV season has been stopped. In 2023, this show is back but this time it will be aired on MNCTV, GTV's sister channel.
