= Take Me Out (Irish game show) =

- Genre: Dating show
- Presented by: Ray Foley
- Theme music composer: Dan McGrath; Josh Phillips
- Country of origin: Ireland
- Original language: English
- No. of series: 6
- No. of episodes: 60

Production
- Producer: Sideline Productions
- Running time: 42–45 minutes

Original release
- Network: TV3
- Release: 15 October 2010 – 4 April 2015

Related
- Taken Out (Australia); Take Me Out (UK)

Take Me Out is an Irish television dating game show airing on TV3. The show is presented by Irish radio personality Ray Foley. It is based on the Australian series Taken Out and the British series of the same name. The series is produced by Sideline Productions for TV3. The series is filmed in The Helix in Dublin.

== Format ==
One single man has to try to impress thirty single women. Each woman has a (white) light which she can turn off (red) if she is unimpressed by the man. His aim is to convince as many women as possible to keep their lights on so that he can then pick, from the women remaining, the one that he wishes to take out on a date.

The game starts when the single man emerges from behind a door while his chosen song is played in the background. There are three rounds during which the women learn more about the man and may choose to turn off their lights. The first round is a brief introduction from the man. The second and third rounds usually have the man talk more about himself for 30 seconds ("Flirty for Thirty"), show off a talent (song, dance, trick, etc.), or a video is shown of the man's friends promoting him and talking more about his background.

After these rounds, if there are more than two women left with their lights on, the single man must walk around and turn off the lights of those remaining until he is left with two. Once there are two, he must ask a question to both women to help decide which one he would like to take out, after which he will turn off one more light and date the remaining woman. If there is one woman left after the three rounds, they will go on a date. If all the women turn off their lights in what is referred to as a "blackout" then the man must leave the show alone.

The couples' "dates" – which are not shown in full – take place in a shady faux nightclub in the back of the studio called "Shifters". They are briefly interviewed in the next episode (or if it is the last in the series, in the same episode) about how their date went, and asked if they would go out again.

Usually four men are presented during each episode. When a woman goes on a date, she leaves her podium and a new woman takes her place. Otherwise, the women remain at their podiums and return for subsequent episodes of the series.

== Episodes ==
Red: The boy failed to get a date

Silver: The boy got a date, but the couple was unsuccessful.

Gold: The boy got a date, and the couple was successful.

=== Season 1 ===
| # | Airdate | No. of couples | 1 | 2 | 3 | 4 | 5 |
|---|---|---|---|---|---|---|---|
| 1 | 15 October 2010 | 2 | Ruairí & Sarah | Brendan | Ben | Brian & Kerrie | — |
| 2 | 22 October 2010 | 2 | Cormac & Aisling | John | Shane & Catherine | Conor | — |
| 3 | 29 October 2010 | 3 | Éanna & Lorraine | Jonathan & Terrie | Keith | Karl & Jessie | — |
| 4 | 5 November 2010 | 4 | Niall & Pricia | J.J. & Lisya | Emmett & Madison | Seán & Gill | — |
| 5 | 12 November 2010 | 2 | Marc & Shannon | Ross | Kevin | Richie & Rachel | — |
| 6 | 19 November 2010 | 3 | J.J. & Niamh | Jason & Joleen | Dan | Neil & Rania | — |
| 7 | 26 November 2010 | 4 | Carl & Stephanie | Emmett & Mairéad | Brian & Louise | Kyle & Madison | — |
| 8 | 3 December 2010 | 2 | Paulie & Eleanor | Alan & Sinéad | Ian | Nigel | Michael |
| 9 | 10 December 2010 | 4 | Seán & Lorna | Michael & Mairéad | Dave & Aoife | Paul & Sarah-Jane | — |
| 10 | 17 December 2010 | 3 | Rob & Niamh | Dónal & Nuala | Derek | Diarmaid & Janine | — |

=== Season 2 ===
| # | Airdate | No. of couples | 1 | 2 | 3 | 4 | 5 |
|---|---|---|---|---|---|---|---|
| 1 | 7 January 2011 | 2 | Stephen & Molly | Damien | Robbie & Aisling | Ty | Daire |
| 2 | 14 January 2011 | 4 | Alan & Roisin | Rich & Jane .C. | Aaron & Mairead | Connor & Emma | — |
| 3 | 21 January 2011 | 3 | Garry & Claire | Kevin & Emma | Raol & Eva | Ronan | — |
| 4 | 28 January 2011 | 3 | Andrew & Stephanie | John | Peter & Jenny .B. | Mark & Catherine | — |
| 5 | 4 February 2011 | 3 | Antonio & Jillian | Connor & Lauren | Charles | Shane & Carla | — |
| 6 | 11 February 2011 | 3 | Eamon & Emma | Owen | David & Liz | Brian & Katie | — |
| 7 | 18 February 2011 | 4 | Michael & Sarah | Brian & Donna | Mark & Keelin | Ryan & Amy | — |
| 8 | 25 February 2011 | 3 | Jules & Fleur | Gary & Irina | Eddie | Graham & Cliona | — |
| 9 | 4 March 2011 | 4 | Jason & Jessica | Tom & Faye | Owen & Jordana | Ian & Cheryl | — |
| 10 | 11 March 2011 | 4 | Simon & Chelcy | Colin & Paula | Adrian & Eilis | Rick & Jenny | — |

=== Season 3 ===
| # | Airdate | No. of couples | 1 | 2 | 3 | 4 | 5 |
|---|---|---|---|---|---|---|---|
| 1 | 20 January 2012 | 1 | Pierce & Roisín | Ngalinda | Kevin | David | Gerard |
| 2 | 27 January 2012 | 3 | Karl & Louise | Mike | Karl & Amy | Vinny & Fiona | — |
| 3 | 3 February 2012 | 3 | Adam & Aoife | Colm & Rachel | Patrick | Glenn & Victoria | — |
| 4 | 10 February 2012 | 2 | Cian | Liam | Tony & Serena | Rohan & Adrienne | — |
| 5 | 17 February 2012 | 2 | Benny | Cian & Mya | Steven & Simone | Rudi | — |
| 6 | 24 February 2012 | 4 | Connor & Taylor-Rae | Anthony | Liam & Emi | Fergal & Rosalyn | Stephen & Monyka |
| 7 | 2 March 2012 | 4 | Eoghan & Shauna | Sean & Anita | Robert & Ariana | Wayne & Mollie | — |
| 8 | 9 March 2012 | 3 | Dominic & Joanne | David | Shane & Cora | Chris & Eimile | — |
| 9 | 16 March 2012 | 3 | Daniel & Tessa | Thomas & Regina | Piarais | Stewart & Grace | — |
| 10 | 23 March 2012 | 2 | Shane & Dawn | Ozzy | Tom | Mark & Saoirse | — |

=== Season 4 ===
| # | Airdate | No. of couples | 1 | 2 | 3 | 4 | 5 |
|---|---|---|---|---|---|---|---|
| 1 | 4 January 2013 | 2 | Sean | Simon & Michelle | Geoff | Jimmy | David & Mairead |
| 2 | 11 January 2013 | 2 | Kristian & Orlagh | Jonathan | Philip & Stephanie | Eanna | — |
| 3 | 18 January 2013 | 3 | Jamie & Cathriona | Brian | Nick & Naomi | Declan & Shahira | — |
| 4 | 25 January 2013 | 3 | Mark & Niamh | Gurpreet | Ronan & Julie | Jordan & Aimee | — |
| 5 | 1 February 2013 | 4 | Peter & Kylie | Paddy & Rachel | Keith & Chantelle | David & Maggie | — |
| 6 | 8 February 2013 | 3 | Ricky & Leanne | Ben | Alan & Melanie | Stuart & Emma-Louise | — |
| 7 | 15 February 2013 | 4 | Cathal & Robin | Daniel & Iseult | Don & Orla | Conor & Linda | — |
| 8 | 22 February 2013 | 4 | Taylor & Áine | Jason & Debby | Martin & Maeve | Dermot & Rita | — |
| 9 | 1 March 2013 | 3 | Mitchell & Tara | Jarlath | Eugene & Martha | Alan & Domenik | — |
| 10 | 8 March 2013 | 4 | Cormac & Jodie | Jimmy & Tasha | Michael & Emma-Marie | David & Chancelle | — |

=== Season 5 ===
| # | Airdate | No. Of Couples | 1 | 2 | 3 | 4 | 5 |
|---|---|---|---|---|---|---|---|
| 1 | 7 June 2014 | 4 | Zac & Dove | Ben & Amy | Zain & Genevieve | Will & Harriet | — |
| 2 | 14 June 2014 | 2 | Glenn & Nikki | Josh | Ian | Chris & Orlagh | — |
| 3 | 21 June 2014 | 3 | Liam & Chloe | Reggie | Karl & Esme | J.J. & Maggie | — |
| 4 | 28 June 2014 | 3 | Will & Brie | Oliver | Connor & Megan | Reece & Courtney | — |
| 5 | 5 July 2014 | 3 | Kieran | John & Carrie | Jesse & Vikki | Ryan & Jacqueline | — |
| 6 | 12 July 2014 | 4 | Harry & Hannah | Shawn & Beckie | Josh & Daniella | Gordon & Sierra | — |
| 7 | 19 July 2014 | 5 | Adam & Rachel | Kevin & Payton | Derek & Autumn | Mark & Sylvia | Jordan & Mikayla |
| 8 | 26 July 2014 | 3 | Shane & Ellie | Lorrence | Ethan & Betty | Sam & Crystal | — |
| 9 | 2 August 2014 | 4 | Leo & Elle | Lucas & Sasha | Chiles & Coco | Joey & Bethany | — |
| 10 | 9 August 2014 | 5 | Fergus & Whitney | Oscar & Tori | Mike & Shauna | Jarvis & Holly | Dan & Joanna |

=== Season 6 ===
| # | Airdate | No. Of Couples | 1 | 2 | 3 | 4 | 5 |
|---|---|---|---|---|---|---|---|
| 1 | 3 January 2015 | 3 | Gregg | Joe | Steven & Blair | Todd & Mimi | Fred & Georgia |
| 2 | 10 January 2015 | 3 | Callum & Morgan | George | Peter & Brianna | Tom & Kiki | — |
| 3 | 17 January 2015 | 5 | Darrell & Rose | Nick & Victoria | Hans & Lil | Jay & Poppy | Cormac & Kat |
| 4 | 24 January 2015 | 2 | Teddy & Madison | Emmett | Joel & Niamh | Shane | — |
| 5 | 31 January 2015 | 3 | Rob & Gabriella | Mark & Sophia | J.J & Lorna | Bill | — |
| 6 | 7 February 2015 | 2 | Simon & Olivia | Freddie | James & Erin | Wilson | — |
| 7 | 14 February 2015 | 4 | Tyler & Kerrie | Ash & Sinead | Tye & Phoebe | Jesse & Debby | — |
| 8 | 21 February 2015 | 3 | Ed & Alexa | Brad & Mairead | Rick & Emily | Neil | — |
| 9 | 28 February 2015 | 2 | Nathan & Zoey | Christopher | Jonathan | Barnaby & Isabelle | — |
| 10 | 4 April 2015 | 3 | Kieran | Keith & Tiffany | Ross & Dani | Brandon & Trina | Lee |
