= The Gift (2007 TV program) =

- Genre: Observational Documentary
- Narrated by: Tara Brown
- Country of origin: Australia
- Original language: English
- No. of seasons: 2
- No. of episodes: 16

Production
- Producer: FremantleMedia Australia
- Running time: 30 minutes

Original release
- Network: Nine Network
- Release: 11 October 2007 – 2009

The Gift is an Australian observational documentary television program that aired on the Nine Network at 9:30 pm, Thursdays. It was narrated by 60 Minutes journalist Tara Brown. The Gift explores the stories and importance of organ donation in Australia. A second series aired at 9:00pm Wednesdays, debuting on 12 August 2009.
