= Take Me Out (Philippine game show) =

2010 Philippine television game show

- Title card
- Genre: Dating game show
- Based on: Taken Out by FremantleMedia France
- Directed by: Rico Gutierrez
- Presented by: Jay R
- Country of origin: Philippines
- Original language: Tagalog

Production
- Executive producer: Wilma Galvante
- Camera setup: Multiple-camera setup
- Running time: 30–45 minutes
- Production company: GMA Entertainment TV

Original release
- Network: GMA Network
- Release: April 26 – July 2, 2010

Take Me Out is a 2010 Philippine television dating game show broadcast by GMA Network. The show is based on the Australian game show Taken Out. Hosted by Jay R, it premiered on April 26, 2010. The show concluded on July 2, 2010.

== Format ==
The single guy needs to impress thirty single ladies through a series of videos or interviews about him. Each woman has a light which she can turn off if she is unimpressed by the single man. The man's aim is to convince as many women as possible to keep their lights on so that he can then pick, from the women remaining, the one that he wishes to take on a date. If no lights are left on, then the man must leave the show without a date. At the end of the game, the guy may choose a date from the women who leave their lights on.

The format also adopted the changes made by the Indonesian version. One of which features a celebrity trying to get a date, entitled Take A Celebrity Out. Some of the celebrities who participated are Victor Aliwalas, Arthur Solinap, and Luis Alandy. The other features a woman trying to impress the thirty single guys, entitled Take Him Out. Some of the celebrities who participated are Aicelle Santos, Gretchen Espina and Chariz Solomon.

== Ratings ==
According to AGB Nielsen Philippines' Mega Manila household television ratings, the pilot episode of Take Me Out earned a 9.5% rating. The final episode scored a 4.5% rating in Metro Manila People/Individual television ratings.
