= Dagens man =

Swedish dating television show

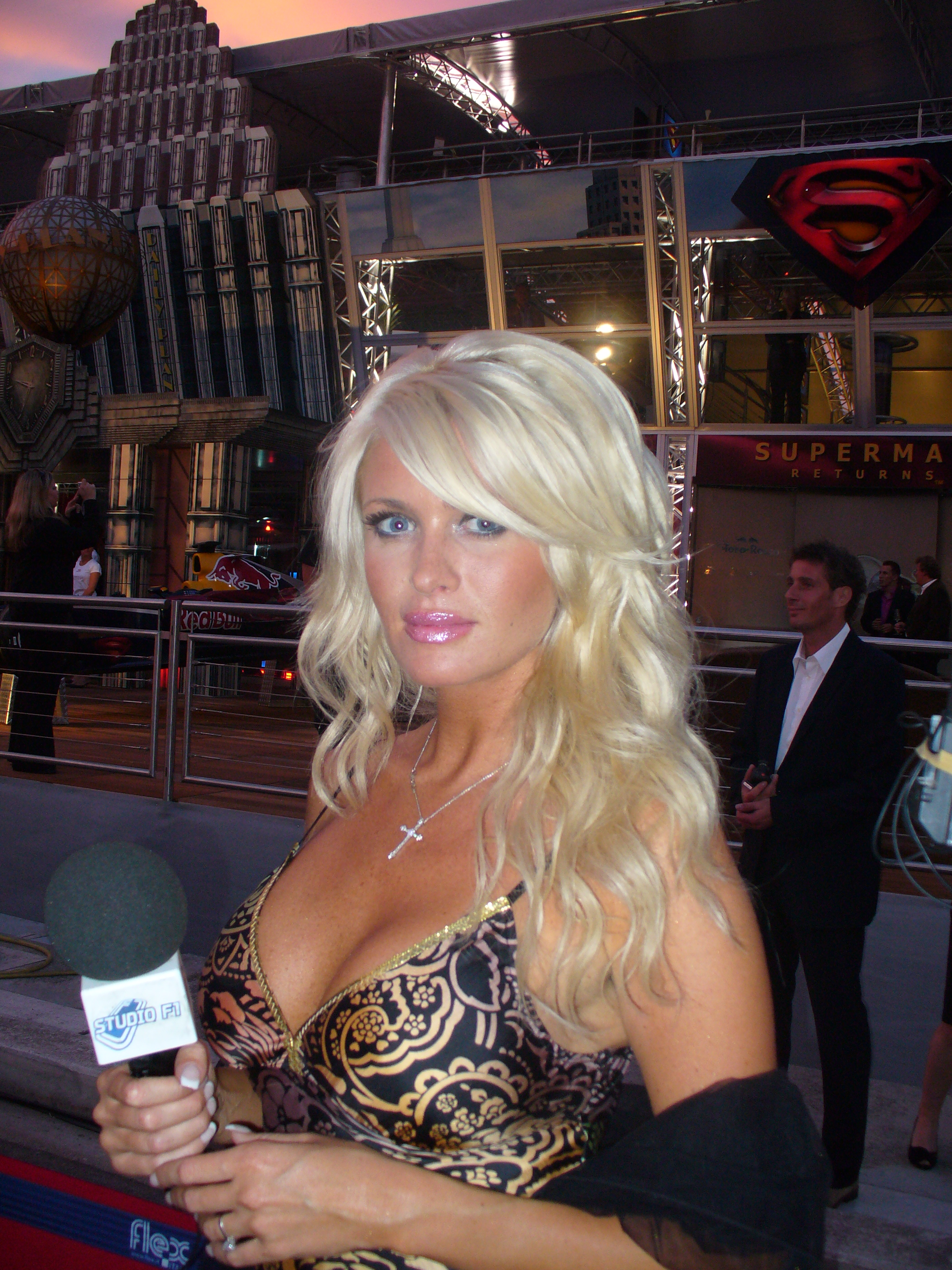
Carolina Gynning the host of Dagens man

Dagens man (English: Man of the day) is a Swedish dating show on TV4 Plus hosted by model and actress Carolina Gynning. The show is based on Taken Out which has been broadcast in Australia, Holland, Spain, Finland, Denmark and Norway. In the studio there are 20 ladies who meets a man at the time and has to decide if they want to continue playing for a chance at a date with the single man. At the second stage of the show the man tells more about himself and still the ladies can reject him at any time. In the third and last stage the man has to ask questions to the ladies and choose one for a date later that day which is follow by cameras. The first two seasons was filmed at the same time in 2009 and broadcast between 2009 and 2010.

== Seasons ==
=== Season 1 (2009) ===
| No. overall | No. in season | The men | Original release date | Viewers |
|---|---|---|---|---|
| 1 | 1 | "Henrik & Patrik" | September 30, 2009 | 121 000 |
| 2 | 2 | "Nima & Johan" | October 7, 2009 | 144 000 |
| 3 | 3 | "Dennis & Johnny" | October 14, 2009 | 50 000 |
| 4 | 4 | "Michael & Jakob" | October 21, 2009 | 88 000 |
| 5 | 5 | "Mithras & John" | October 28, 2009 | 98 000 |
| 6 | 6 | "Theo & Magnus" | November 4, 2009 | 82 000 |
| 7 | 7 | "Björn & Martin" | November 11, 2009 | 73 000 |
| 8 | 8 | "Peter & Patrik" | November 18, 2009 | 45 000 |

=== Season 2 ===
| No. overall | No. in season | The men | Original release date | Viewers |
|---|---|---|---|---|
| 1 | 9 | "Andreas & Kristoffer" | June 16, 2010 | 49 000 |
| 2 | 10 | "Johannes & Robert" | June 21, 2010 | 49 000 |
| 3 | 11 | "Martin & Martin" | June 23, 2010 | 52 000 |
| 4 | 12 | "Hjalmar & Richard" | June 24, 2010 | 14 000 |
| 5 | 13 | "Peter & Tomas" | June 25, 2010 | 26 000 |
| 6 | 14 | "Jesper & Jimmy" | June 28, 2010 | 38 000 |
| 7 | 15 | "Jesper & Magnus" | June 29, 2010 | 57 000 |
| 8 | 16 | "Romeo & Srdjan" | July 1, 2010 | 29 000 |
| 9 | 17 | "Erik & Kim" | July 2, 2010 | 24 000 |
| 10 | 18 | "Daniel & Johan" | July 5, 2010 | 41 000 |
| 11 | 19 | "Christoffer & Daniel" | July 8, 2010 | 65 000 |
| 12 | 20 | "Dylan & Jens" | July 9, 2010 | 42 000 |
