= Ahmo Hight =

American model (died 2023)

- Born: September 18, 1973; Chicago, Illinois, U.S.
- Died: August 29, 2023 (aged 49)
- Other names: Amy Hite, Milf
- Occupations: Fitness model; pornography actress; actress; reality television star
- Years active: 1996-2009
- Partner: Chris Cormier
- Children: 1

Ahmo Kathleen Hight (September 18, 1973 – August 29, 2023) was an American fitness model, actress, pornography actress and reality television star. She also went by the alias Amy Hite. Best known for her work in softcore pornography and for her appearances on hit VH1 celebreality shows; Real Chance of Love season 1 and I Love Money season 2.

== Television career ==
Hight launched her acting career in 1997, sometimes performing under the name Amy Hight. Hight appeared in an episode of American television show, Pacific Blue. In 1998 she featured in an episode of the television series Hotel Exotica. In 1998 she appeared opposite Anna Nicole Smith in the faux documentary, Exposed: Anna Nicole Smith.

Hight appeared in a number of television commercials for various brands.

In 2008 Hight was a contestant on the VH1 celebreality series Real Chance of Love season 1. Hight was a part of the "Real girls", the contestants who were there to date Ahmad "Real" Givens and made the top three, placing sixth overall. She received the nickname "Milf" as she stated she was 35 years old and had a 9-year-old son. During her time on the show she engaged in drama with contestants Konanga "Bay Bay Bay" Tyson and Ebony "Risky" Jones.

In 2009 Hight appeared on the second season of the hit VH1 celebreality spin-off series I Love Money. Hight continued to use her nickname "Milf". Hight was eliminated in the fifth episode, leaving her in fourteenth place.

== Personal life and death ==
Hight has one son with American bodybuilder, Chris Cormier.

On 26 March 2015, Hight was charged with second degree assault and domestic assault, after stabbing a man with a pair of scissors in Watertown, Minnesota.

Hight died on 29 August 2023, at the age of 49. It is believed she died due to a blood clot caused by a fall, her cause of death is yet to be confirmed as of 2025.

== Filmography ==
=== Film and television ===
Year	Title	Role	Notes
1996	Playboy: Hard Bodies	Self, model	Direct to video
1997	Pacific Blue	Joanne	1 episode
1998	Erotic Confessions	Emily	1 episode
1998	Inside Club Wild Side	Angela	Direct to video
1998	Restless Souls	Mary	
1998	Hotel Exotica	Rachel	1 episode
1998	Exposed: Anna Nicole Smith	The maid	
2000	Passion's Desire	Nancy	
2000	Insatiable Wives	Sandra	
2002	Secret Pleasures	Cara	
2005	Strip Poker	Self, contestant	Direct to DVD
2008	Real Chance of Love season 1	Self, contestant	6th place, 13 episodes
2009	I Love Money season 2	Self, contestant	14th place, 6 episodes
2023	Perimeter	Ahmo	Completed, no set date released

== Awards and accomplishments ==
=== Bodybuilding ===
- Ms. Fitness USA (1994)
- Ms. Fit Body Bay Area (1994)
