= TubeCrush =

British website

TubeCrush.net is a British website for women and gay men to upload picture of men they find attractive on the London Underground. The website has become popular since its creation in 2011 as a "drunken joke" by four young roommates.

== Allegations of sexism ==
The company behind TubeCrush.net has come under scrutiny due to their decision only to show pictures of men on their website. When the technical controller of the website was asked about the issue by the BBC, he said:

We felt like men taking pictures of women on the tube feels different - it's not the same as gay men or women taking pictures of other men.

This prompted an outrage on many social media outlets, but the founders have stated in other press interviews that they are "working on" a version that allows users to upload photos of women.

Sunny Hundal for The Guardian wrote:

What struck me was the casual way that the Evening Standard reported on the story in a "oh look, cool young things have set up a website so we can perve on each other" type of way. Maybe it was just an extremely slow news day. But if the sexes had been reversed, would it have been seen so benign? Probably not. I just found the Evening Standard's casual attitude a bit off.

== Associated websites ==
There are currently two other websites which are run by the same company, which operate in different locations. These are SubwayCrush.net which is focused on the New York City Subway (MTA), and BostonTcrush.com which is based on the Boston T train network (MBTA). Both websites currently down.

TubeCrush has also spawned a copy cat website, Luascrush.com in Ireland, which was not operated by the same company but was created by Johann Taljaard. However that was taken down in August after being contacted by the Data Protection Commissioner.
