= Beat the Odds (Australian game show) =

1970s Australian TV show

Beat the Odds is an Australian television series which aired 1971 to 1972 on the Seven Network. The series aired for a summer season. Hosted by Malcolm Searle, it was a game show based on the visual identification of people, places and objects. It was produced by Reg Grundy Productions.
