= Take Me Out to the Ball Game (disambiguation) =

"Take Me Out to the Ball Game" is a Tin Pan Alley song that became the unofficial anthem of baseball.

Take Me Out to the Ball Game may also refer to:

- Take Me Out to the Ball Game (film), a 1949 motion picture
- "Take Me Out to the Ballgame" (SATC episode), an episode of Sex and the City

== See also ==
- Take Me Up to the Ball Game, a 1980 Nelvana TV special
