= The Match Off =

American television series

The Match Off is a national television series produced by LX.TV. Hosted by Maria Sansone, the reality show airs on NBC after Saturday Night Live. The premise of the series is to have two professional matchmakers compete against each other to find the best date for a featured single person in each episode. The first episode aired on June 26, 2010.

== Season 1 ==
=== Episode 1 ===
Professional matchmakers Matt Titus and Lisa Ronis are challenged with finding the right mate for Kira Saltzman, a 29-year-old real estate agent in New York City.

=== Episode 2 ===
A director, producer, model and actor, Levi Holiman searches for love in Los Angeles. Local matchmaking duos Luis Santiago and Kim Lockhart, and Sherry and Eva Singer go head to head to seek a soulmate for Levi.

=== Episode 4 ===
David Fischer is the bachelor, NYC. The matchmakers are Rachel Greenwald of Elevated Connections, LLC and Maureen Tara Nelson of Maureen Tara Nelson Private Matchmaking, Inc.
