= Joel Creasey =

Australian stand-up comedian (born 1990)

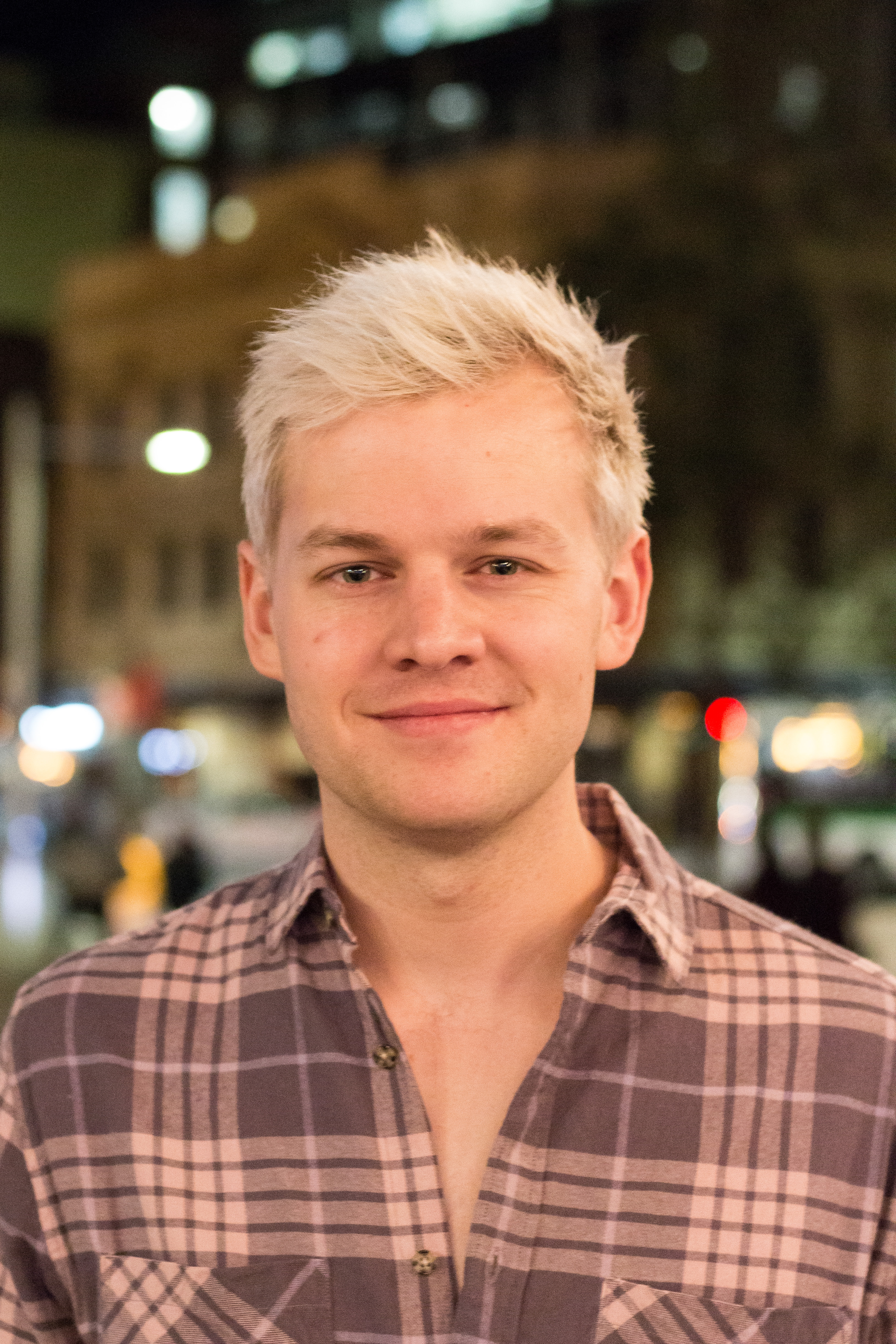
- Creasey in July 2018
- Born: 11 August 1990 (age 36); Sydney, Australia
- Education: Wesley College, Perth
- Partner: Jack Stratton-Smith

Comedy career
- Years active: 2007–present
- Medium: Stand-up, television
- Genres: Observational comedy; blue comedy; insult comedy

Joel Creasey (born 11 August 1990) is an Australian stand-up comedian, actor, television and radio presenter.

Creasey has performed at the Melbourne International Comedy Festival, as well as performing at the New York International Fringe Festival in 2013 and 2014 and the Edinburgh Fringe in 2015.

== Early life ==
Creasey was born in the Sydney suburb of Baulkham Hills and moved to Perth at a young age. His father, Terry, worked as a model while his mother, Jenny, was a singer. The couple met on the set of Star Wars: The Empire Strikes Back in which they both appeared as extras. His father was also the "Solo" man in the iconic 1985 advertisement for the soft drink and currently owns several McDonald's restaurants in Perth. Creasey has two sisters.

Creasey is openly gay. He came out to his family and friends in 2007, when he was sixteen. He attended high school at Wesley College, where he graduated in 2007. At school, Creasey founded and was editor-in-chief of the student newspaper The Wesley Inquirer, and drama captain. He later studied political science and foreign affairs at Curtin University for three months before dropping out to focus on his career in stand-up comedy.

== Stand-up career ==
Creasey first attempted stand-up comedy when he was fifteen years old. When Creasey was seventeen, he entered Raw Comedy, a national stand-up competition; and made it to the state finals in Perth. Creasey made his Melbourne International Comedy Festival debut in 2010, with a show entitled Slumber Party at the Kitten Club. The show earned Creasey a nomination for Best Newcomer at the end of the festival and he was signed to Andrew Taylor Management. In 2011, Creasey presented his second show, Political Animal, at multiple comedy festivals. His third show, Naked, saw Creasey gain considerable media attention and positive reviews. This was followed in 2013 with The Drama Captain, which saw Creasey sell out 23 consecutive shows in Melbourne and received Best Show nominations at both the Sydney and Perth Comedy Festivals.

In 2014, he started touring with his fifth festival show, Rock God, which gained him significant media coverage and a sold-out national tour. During this period, Creasey began being referred to as "Australia's Acid Tongue Prince". Creasey toured the show to Kuala Lumpur, Singapore and Hong Kong with the Melbourne International Comedy Festival. Later, he participated in the Just for Laughs festival in Montreal, Canada, before presenting Rock God at the Fringe Festival in New York City. Creasey also toured Rock God to the Soho Theatre in London. Joan Rivers, upon seeing his act, booked him to open for her in New York in August 2014.

The New York Post named Rock God as one of the top five events of the New York Fringe Festival. Under The Gun's review called it "a side-splittingly funny 70-minute display of stand-up that moves at a frantic pace of several laughs per minute..." Time Out also reviewed Rock God positively, writing that "the relentlessly hilarious 23-year-old has the chops of a much more seasoned performer, and the charisma of an inevitable star". The Sydney Morning Herald wrote that "he's a confident storyteller – energetic, concise, but conversational – with a ruthless wit and an infectious oh-my-god enthusiasm."

In late 2014, it was revealed that Creasey had been selected to host the 2015 Melbourne International Comedy Festival Gala. It was announced in early 2015 that Creasey's sixth festival show would be titled The Hurricane and was subsequently toured both nationally and internationally.

In 2018, he was appointed as one of two Fringe Ambassadors for the Adelaide Fringe and presented his show Blonde Bombshell there. Creasey's 2018 Just for Laughs set was filmed and featured as part of a stand-up comedy series on Netflix in 2019.

== Television work ==
Creasey's credits include appearing as a panellist on The Circle, Studio 10, Tractor Monkeys, A League of Their Own, The Project, 20 to 1, It's a Date, Talkin' 'Bout Your Generation, All Star Family Feud, Celebrity Name Game, Have You Been Paying Attention? and Hughesy, We Have a Problem. Creasey has also performed televised stand-up on the Melbourne International Comedy Festival Gala, Comedy Up Late and Just for Laughs; as well as heading up the winning team on the Comedy Festival's Great Debate for 2014.

In 2011, Creasey was abused and chased by an aggressive group of teenagers after his show in Colac. He was presenting at Straight Shooters anti-discrimination event, held by local community group DYNAMIC. The group of teenagers threatened to beat Creasey and his friends for being homosexual. In 2014, Creasey returned to Colac with fellow comedian Rhys Nicholson as a part of an ABC documentary entitled Gay Crashers.

In 2015, Creasey was one of the contestants on the Australian version of I'm a Celebrity...Get Me Out of Here! He lasted 41 days on the show, eventually being eliminated on 10 March 2015.

In 2017, Creasey and Myf Warhurst were announced as hosts of SBS's broadcast of the 62nd Eurovision Song Contest, which was held in Kyiv, Ukraine. The two returned to commentate for SBS each year until 2024. They also hosted three editions of Eurovision – Australia Decides and the show Eurovision 2020: Big Night In.

Creasey appeared as Oscar in Australian television drama Sisters, and Mick Allsop in Neighbours. In 2018, Creasey was appointed as one of the team captains in Show Me the Movie!. Creasey hosted the dating game show Take Me Out in 2018.

In March 2021, Creasey co-hosted SBS's coverage of the Sydney Gay and Lesbian Mardi Gras celebration. Creasey also featured in an advertisement for Virgin Money.

In the second half of 2021, Creasey briefly turned up again in Neighbours, reprising his role as Mick Allsop.

New Leash on Life, a six-episode ABC series co-hosted by Creasey and dog behaviourist Laura Vissaritis, premiered in July 2023. The series seeks to connect dogs from pounds with new owners.

In 2026, he competed on season 5 of Taskmaster Australia.

== Radio work ==
In September 2020, Creasey joined Kate Ritchie and Tim Blackwell as part of Nova FM's national radio show, Kate, Tim and Joel. He replaced Marty Sheargold, who had been on the show since August 2011.

In January 2026, it was announced that Ricki-Lee Coulter and Tim Blackwell would depart Nova’s national drive show to host Ricki-Lee & Tim on Nova 96.9's Sydney breakfast program. Creasey will host The Joel Creasey Show across the Nova Network.

== Other work ==
In November 2019, Creasey hosted the GQ Men of the Year Awards.

== Personal life ==
Creasey began dating Jack Stratton-Smith in 2017. In September 2024, the couple announced their engagement. Creasey and Stratton-Smith live together in Melbourne.

== Stand-up shows ==
- Slumber Party (2010)
- Political Animal (2011)
- Naked (2012)
- The Acid Tongue Prince (2012; live DVD)
- The Drama Captain (2013)
- Rock God (2014, 2015)
- The Hurricane (2015)
- The Crown Prince (2016)
- Poser (2017)
- Blonde Bombshell (2018)
- Drink. Slay. Repeat. (2019)
- Messy Bitch (2021)
- Boom! (2024)
- Thanks For Being Here (2025)
