= Take Me Out (American game show) =

American dating game show

- Genre: Dating game show
- Directed by: Michael Dempsey
- Presented by: George Lopez
- Theme music composer: David Vanacore; Eric Hester
- Country of origin: United States
- No. of seasons: 1
- No. of episodes: 8

Production
- Executive producer: Jeff Apploff
- Producers: Ves D’Eila; Kate Killoran Dowd; Chuck Stream; Megan Fraher
- Editors: T.J. Mahar; J.D. Brimes; Victor Gonzaga; Tim Leavitt; Mike Polito
- Camera setup: Multi-camera
- Running time: 42 minutes
- Production company: Fremantle

Original release
- Network: Fox
- Release: June 7 – July 26, 2012

Related
- Taken Out (Australia); Take Me Out (UK)

Take Me Out is an American dating game show that was broadcast on Fox. It was based on the British show of the same name, which in turn was based on the original Australian show Taken Out and created based on the success of the international versions. The show was hosted by George Lopez. It premiered on June 7, 2012, at 8:00 p.m. in Canada and the United States with ratings of 3.3 million.

On July 3, 2012, Fox announced that the show would be removed from its Thursday night timeslot and be relegated to Saturday nights, starting on July 14, 2012 to make room for Mobbed, but just three days later, following an increase in ratings over the previous episodes, Fox announced that the show would remain in its Thursday night timeslot.

== Episodes ==
No.	Airdate	No. of couples	1	2	3	4
1	June 7, 2012	2	Brandon	John (Samantha)	Eric	Alain (Michaela)
2	June 14, 2012	3	Jesse (Debra)	Jonnie	Panos (Cournti)	Dave (Kristin)
3	June 21, 2012	2	Danny "Tsunami" (Sana)	Justice	Mikey	Evin (Leslie)
4	June 28, 2012	3	Jimmy K. (Marisa)	Phil (Kelly B.)	Aaron (Jenny)	Sebastian
5	July 5, 2012	2	Shawn	Kash (Sonja)	Michael	Davin (Kasia)
6	July 12, 2012	3	Max (Lisa)	Antonios	Casey (Larena)	Greg (Erin)
7	July 19, 2012	3	Zach (Brooke)	Scott (Crystal)	Will (Mindy)	-
8	July 26, 2012	3	Demarcus (Megan)	Tyler (Joanna)	George (Nicole W.)	-

Yellow indicates the bachelor successfully got a date.
Silver indicates the bachelor failed to get a date.

== Ratings ==
No. in Series	Air date	Timeslot (EST)	18-49 (rating/share)	Viewers (millions)
1	June 7, 2012	Thursday; 8:00 P.M.	1.3/5	3.26
2	June 14, 2012	Thursday; 8:00 P.M.	1.1/4	2.63
3	June 21, 2012	Thursday; 8:00 P.M.	1.2/4	3.22
4	June 28, 2012	Thursday; 8:00 P.M.	1.0/3	2.32
5	July 5, 2012	Thursday; 8:00 P.M.	1.2/4	3.09
6	July 12, 2012	Thursday; 8:00 P.M.	1.2/4	2.99
7	July 19, 2012	Thursday; 8:00 P.M.	1.2/4	3.10
8	July 26, 2012	Thursday; 8:00 P.M.	1.2/4	2.85
