= Angel Karamoy =

Indonesian actress and singer

- Born: Angelina Wilhelmina Karamoy; 16 January 1987 (age 39); Manado, North Sulawesi, Indonesia
- Occupation: Singer
- Years active: 1996–present

Angelina Wilhelmina Karamoy (born 16 January 1987) is an Indonesian actress and singer. She began her debut soap opera in Saras 008 on Indosiar.

== Biography ==
Karamoy was born in North Sulawesi to a Christian family. She began her career as an actress in TV commercials. She has since worked in numerous soap operas, such as Kala Cinta Menggoda, Pelangi Di Matamu 2, Mukjizat Itu Nyata, and Kurindu Jiwaku. Karamoy rose to popularity when she replaced Marshanda's role as Lala in Bidadari 3. She released the spiritual album Mukjizat Itu Nyata. Karamoy appointed as guest star in Opera Van Java from 2013 to 2014. During Ramadhan, she played the role as household assistant in Ini Sahur on MDTV.

Karamoy married Steven McJames Rumangkang on 26 January 2008 at the Jakarta Convention Center. They have two children. In July 2016, she officially divorced her husband.

== Filmography ==
=== Television series ===
- Saras 008
- Pelangi Di Matamu 2
- Hati Di Pucuk Pelangi
- Ada Apa Dengan Pelangi
- ABC&D
- Daun Daun Kering
- Biar Cinta Bicara
- Bidadari 3
- Anak Pungut
- Kala Cinta Menggoda
- Kurindu Jiwaku
- Dunia Belum Kiamat
- Seleb I'm In Love
- Maha Cinta
- Mukjizat Itu Nyata
- Hidayah
- Dibalik Jilbab Zaskia
- Terdampar
- Berbagi Cinta
- Ibrahim Anak Betawi
- Bara Bere
- Emak Ijah Pengen Ke Mekah
- Cowokku Superboy
- Gue Juga Islam
- Surga Yang Kedua
- Masalembo (2015)

=== Other shows ===
- Opera Van Java (Trans 7; 2013–2014)
- Ini Sahur (MDTV; 2014)
