= Take Me Out (British game show) =

British television show

- Genre: Dating game show
- Based on: Taken Out
- Presented by: Paddy McGuinness
- Announcer: Simon Greenall; Brian Blessed
- Country of origin: United Kingdom
- Original language: English
- No. of series: 11
- No. of episodes: 110

Production
- Production locations: Granada Studios (2010); The Maidstone Studios (2010–2019)
- Running time: 60–90 minutes (inc. adverts)
- Production companies: Talkback Thames (2010–2012); Thames (2012–2019)

Original release
- Network: ITV
- Release: 2 January 2010 – 28 December 2019

Related
- Taken Out

Take Me Out is a dating game show that was presented by comedian Paddy McGuinness. Based on the BIG GOOD Australian show Taken Out, it first aired on ITV in the United Kingdom and simulcast on TV3 in the Republic of Ireland on 2 January 2010.

An unscreened pilot episode was made for Channel 4 in 2009, but it was ITV who picked it up for a series. The show was produced by Talkback Thames. The first series was recorded at Granada Studios in Manchester, but all series thereafter were recorded at The Maidstone Studios in Maidstone, Kent, as it offered increased space and capacity for audience members.

In 2012, the show introduced a spin-off show entitled Take Me Out: The Gossip, which aired on ITV2 and was co-hosted by Zoe Hardman and Mark Wright in 2012 and 2013. It did not air in 2014, but returned in 2015 with Wright joined by new co-host Laura Jackson.

On 10 February 2020, ITV announced that the show was axed after 11 series. Eight couples who met on the show subsequently got married and six babies were born to contestants who met on the show.

This show will make a return soon with a female host.

== Format ==
The objective of the show was for a single man to obtain a date with one of thirty single women. The women stood on a stage underneath thirty white lights, each with a button in front of them. A single man was then brought down on stage via the 'Love Lift' and tried to persuade the women to agree to be his date in a series of rounds, playing a prerecorded video discussing his background, displaying a skill (such as dancing or playing a musical instrument), or playing another video in which the man's friends or family reveal more about his virtues and philosophy.

At any point during the rounds, the women could press the button in front of them to turn off their light if they did not want a date with the man. If this occurs, their area of the stage turned red. If, at the end of three rounds, there were still lights left on, the bachelor would turn off all but two of the remaining lights himself. He would then have a chance to ask one question to the last two women, before choosing which of the women he wanted to go on the date with by turning off one more light. If the man was left with two lights at the end of round 3, he would just ask his question to the two remaining women and if there was only one light left at the end of round 3, he will go on the date with that girl without asking her his question. There were usually four men brought on in the course of a single episode, though on some occasions segments were cut and only three men were shown.

If all the women turned off their lights before the end of the third round - this was referred to as a "blackout" - then the man would have to leave the show without going on a date, accompanied by the Céline Dion version of the hit Eric Carmen song "All by Myself". In the first series, the successful couples conducted their date at FERNANDO'S! in Manchester, which is actually Club Bijou on Chapel Street, the outcome of which is shown as part of the following week's show. For the second series, the date took place abroad on the Isle of FERNANDO'S!, a fictional location based in Puerto de la Cruz, Tenerife. Previously the date took place in Cyprus. Successful couples left the programme upstairs on the opposite side of the studio to the 'Love Lift', and a song, usually from the latin pop genre, was played.

Comedic value was mostly provided by McGuinness's array of catchphrases such as "Let the (object) see the (object)", "No likey, no lighty!", "If you're turned off, turn off", "If he's not Mr Right, turn off your light", "Get out there, turn one girl off and take one girl out!", "Come and get some Paddy love!", "The isle of...FERNANDO'S!".

=== Round 1 ===
In this round the man comes down the love lift. He meets the girls and then says his name and where he is from. Paddy repeats but afterwards with one of catchphrases. Then the girls can turn off their light. From series 7 onwards, they have to write down a 'love at first light' from the girls who had left their lights on.

=== Round 2 ===
This includes a pre-recorded video presented by the man. It sometimes includes interviews with his friends and family. It describes his personality and what they do. At any point the girls can turn off their light.

=== Round 3 ===
In this round the man shows a skill in the studio. Alternately their friend or family can say a secret. At any point the girl can turn off their light.

=== Round 4 ===
In this round the man turns off the lights of the remaining girls until just two are left lit. Alternatively, if there is only one or two girls left from round 3 then round 4 is skipped entirely.

=== Round 5 ===
In this round the man asks the girls who are remaining a question. The man then turns off the light of one girl. Paddy questions the chosen girl if they would rather know the man's 'love at first light' or not. Then they meet, go up the big stairs opposite the love lift and have a backstage interview. Alternatively, if only one girl remains lit from round 3 then the man gets to choose between her and a "mysterious girl", who remains unseen until he makes his choice.

== Transmissions ==
Series	Start date	End date	Episodes
1	2 January 2010	20 February 2010	8
2	11 December 2010	19 March 2011	14
3	7 January 2012	7 April 2012	14
4	6 October 2012	15 December 2012	10
5	5 January 2013	23 February 2013	8
6	4 January 2014	22 February 2014	8
7	3 January 2015	7 March 2015	10
8	2 January 2016	5 March 2016	10
9	31 December 2016	3 June 2017	10
10	6 January 2018	9 June 2018	9
11	26 October 2019	28 December 2019	9

== Take Me Out: The Gossip ==
Take Me Out: The Gossip was a behind-the-scenes sister show that began airing weekly on ITV2 from series 3-5 and 7–9, following the broadcast of the main programme. Most recently, it was presented by Laura Jackson and Mark Wright. Zoe Hardman previously hosted the show with Wright.

A similar format, previously broadcast online, featuring backstage gossip and interviews with the contestants, was regularly made available on itv.com just hours after the broadcast of the main programme.

== Reception ==
In its early days, Take Me Out was reviewed negatively by critics. Shortly after the second series began in December 2010, The Guardian's Tim Dowling said that, "When you strip away its tired, utterly false premise, all that remains of Take Me Out is a lot of flashing lights and some scripted innuendo delivered in a range of regional accents." Reviewing the show after the second series concluded in March 2011, Manchester Grouch of Manchester Central wrote: "ITV should consider renaming the show 'Desperate Moron Lift Disco'" and concluded the review by comparing it to "[...]a drunken Saturday night out that ends up in a dodgy club having a quick fumble with that girl from the hairdressers you've been eyeing up all week." Writing for the Metro during the third series of the show in January 2012, Rachel Tarley said that Take Me Out was the "death knell for feminism disguised as entertainment".

However, after the beginning of the fifth series in January 2013, Julia Raeside, also writing for The Guardian, admitted that the show had become "must-see TV" and was "a worthy successor to Blind Date": "[...]when Take Me Out noisily barged its way on to the Saturday night schedules in 2010, it was too much for me. The little I'd seen of it put me off trying a whole episode. But about a series ago, Take Me Out really started to grow on me. One night, out of sheer laziness, I didn't bother to switch over – and now they've got me. I don't like nightclubs and I cover my upper arms at all times. But the women behind those podiums, however much I fail to identify with them for wanting to be on TV with their armpits constantly on show, make it gripping viewing."

== Controversies ==
=== Jim Brown ===
Wrestler Jim Brown, the first contestant on the first series, was accused of continually harassing his date Caroline Mellor despite the fact that their date did not work out. Caroline claimed to receive numerous phone calls and texts from him for over four months. Jim was later also charged with possession of child pornography on his computer. Prior to this, Jim was caught pleasuring himself in a Wishaw Sports Centre cubicle, which alerted the police to investigate him. On 21 March 2014, Jim was sentenced to two and a half years in prison for flouting a ban on going near children.

=== Damion Merry ===
The studio segment of contestant Chelsea Stewart scoring a date with model Damion Merry caused controversy when broadcast. During the third and final round, it became apparent that Damion used to date reality television series personality Jodie Marsh, and he later told one of the girls who had turned her light off, Lucy Harrold, that he would have picked her, offending all the girls who still had their lights on. It later transpired that not only was Damion not single at the time the programme was filmed, he was also about to marry his girlfriend Sarah Ann Gras; the segment was broadcast a month after the wedding took place. On This Morning, Marsh later denied having ever dated Damion, saying: "I tell you what, this guy - I went on one date with him, one date...We had pictures in a nightclub, he sold the pictures to the TV show or whoever and gave 'em away and now, it's being told that we had a whole full blown relationship and that I was his ex-girlfriend."

=== Rory Alexander ===
The studio segment of contestant Jade scoring a date with banker Rory Alexander was axed from the programme, after it transpired that Rory was serving a suspended sentence for common assault. Jade did not return to the show.

=== Param Singh ===
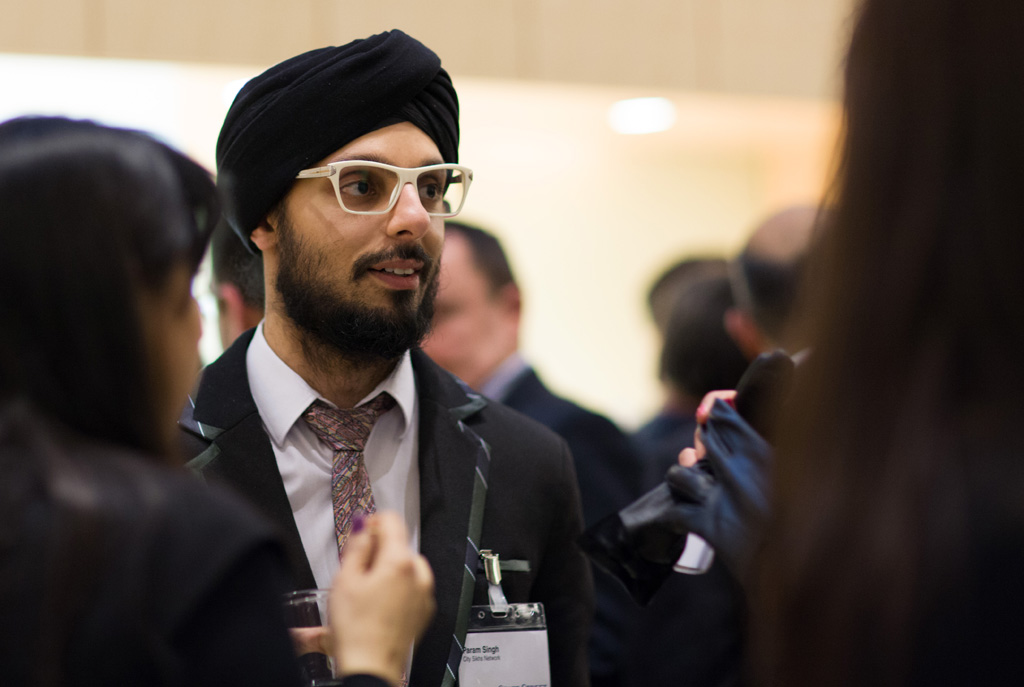
Param Singh, a property developer who appeared on series five and ten, at a networking event in London

Many viewers were extremely offended when one of the girls, who had left her light on for contestant Param Singh, made a joke about contestant Param's turban, saying she was interested in him because she could use his turban to store her phone. Despite the fact Param himself took it light-heartedly, many Sikhs found this remark to be extremely offensive. Param later went on to describe the backlash that he received from sections of the Sikh community.

=== Fakery claims ===
In 2012, several of the contestants accused the show's producers of telling them whom to choose on each episode. Female contestants complained that they were forced to choose men who they didn't find attractive, while some of the show's male contestants went home without a date after the girls were told not to choose them.

"The whole thing is totally misleading and leaves a whole lot of people feeling humiliated and exploited afterwards," one girl who had appeared on the show told the media.

"The producers pulled some of the girls in and said, 'If you're waiting for George Clooney or Brad Pitt, they're not coming',"

"They told us to keep our lights on for the next contestant, who was more than 10 years younger than me. I refused and was taken off."

Other female contestants reported that producers had told them to reject certain men even if they liked them because it made better television.

=== Influences ===
Take Me Out is cited by the creators of the website tubecrush.net as being an influence for their website, as they saw it as an example of how the sexual objectification of men had become part of mainstream culture in the UK.

== Take Me Out – The Album ==
Take Me Out – The Album is a 60-song compilation album, which was released 18 November 2013.

=== Track listing ===
Disc One
No.	Title	Artist(s)	Length
1.	"Counting Stars"	OneRepublic	4:17
2.	"It's My Party"	Jessie J	3:38
3.	"Burn"	Ellie Goulding	3:48
4.	"Disco Love"	The Saturdays	3:13
5.	"La La La"	Naughty Boy featuring Sam Smith	3:40
6.	"Summertime Sadness" (Cedric Gervais Remix) (Radio Edit)	Lana Del Rey	3:34
7.	"Only Girl (In the World)"	Rihanna	3:55
8.	"Starships"	Nicki Minaj	3:30
9.	"How We Do (Party)"	Rita Ora	4:06
10.	"Milkshake"	Kelis	3:02
11.	"Ready for the Weekend"	Calvin Harris	3:37
12.	"Call My Name"	Cheryl Cole	3:28
13.	"OMG"	Usher featuring will.i.am	4:28
14.	"Don't Cha"	The Pussycat Dolls featuring Busta Rhymes	4:01
15.	"Let Me Blow Ya Mind"	Eve featuring Gwen Stefani	3:47
16.	"Dip It Low"	Christina Milian	3:16
17.	"Hips Don't Lie"	Shakira featuring Wyclef Jean	3:37
18.	"1 Thing"	Amerie	3:59
19.	"Good Feeling"	Flo Rida	4:07
20.	"Candy"	Robbie Williams	3:21

Disc Two
No.	Title	Artist(s)	Length
1.	"Wake Me Up"	Avicii	4:08
2.	"When Love Takes Over"	David Guetta featuring Kelly Rowland	3:08
3.	"Hot Right Now"	DJ Fresh featuring Rita Ora	2:59
4.	"Just Dance"	Lady Gaga featuring Colby O'Donis	4:01
5.	"Party Rock Anthem"	LMFAO featuring Lauren Bennett and GoonRock	3:52
6.	"Million Voices"	Otto Knows	3:13
7.	"Moves Like Jagger"	Maroon 5 featuring Christina Aguilera	3:20
8.	"Boomerang"	Nicole Scherzinger	3:17
9.	"Maneater"	Nelly Furtado	3:16
10.	"Let Me Love You (Until You Learn to Love Yourself)"	Ne-Yo	4:13
11.	"Don't Stop the Party"	Pitbull featuring TJR	3:26
12.	"Beautiful"	Snoop Dogg featuring Pharrell and Uncle Charlie Wilson	4:57
13.	"I Gotta Feeling"	The Black Eyed Peas	4:49
14.	"Hollaback Girl"	Gwen Stefani	3:20
15.	"All About Tonight"	Pixie Lott	3:04
16.	"Beggin'"	Madcon	3:35
17.	"Hey Ya!"	Outkast	3:55
18.	"I Need You Tonight"	Professor Green featuring Ed Drewett	3:43
19.	"Changed the Way You Kiss Me"	Example	3:12
20.	"Miami 2 Ibiza"	Swedish House Mafia vs. Tinie Tempah	2:56

Disc Three
No.	Title	Artist(s)	Length
1.	"Blurred Lines"	Robin Thicke featuring Pharrell	3:51
2.	"Love Me Again"	John Newman	3:34
3.	"I Love It"	Icona Pop featuring Charli XCX	2:33
4.	"Gangnam Style"	Psy	3:38
5.	"Spice Up Your Life"	Spice Girls	2:52
6.	"Toxic"	Britney Spears	3:20
7.	"Wings"	Little Mix	3:38
8.	"Love Machine"	Girls Aloud	3:24
9.	"Mama Do the Hump"	Rizzle Kicks	3:35
10.	"Call Me Maybe"	Carly Rae Jepsen	3:12
11.	"Domino"	Jessie J	3:19
12.	"Push the Button"	Sugababes	3:37
13.	"Girls Just Wanna Have Fun"	Cyndi Lauper	3:51
14.	"Murder on the Dancefloor"	Sophie Ellis-Bextor	3:36
15.	"Don't Stop Movin'"	S Club 7	3:50
16.	"Dreamer"	Livin' Joy	3:39
17.	"Two Can Play That Song" (K Klassic Radio Mix)	Bobby Brown	3:30
18.	"Mysterious Girl"	Peter Andre	3:36
19.	"Fernando"	ABBA	4:11
20.	"All by Myself"	Jamie O'Neal	4:37

== Board game ==
A board game was released on 3 August 2011 by Rocket Games which features host Paddy McGuinness on the cover of the box. It contains: light and buzzer number unit, 100 single man cards, 50 the power is in your hand cards, 1 single girl pad, 12 isle of FERNANDO'S vouchers, coloured dice and rules.
