= Dating game show =

Television game shows

Dating game shows are game shows that incorporate a variety of matchmaking systems and services in the form of a game with clear rules. Human matchmaking is involved only in selecting the game's contestants, who are usually selected more for the amusement value than any concern for their happiness or compatibility. The audience sees only the game; an important feature of all dating game shows is that the contestants have little or no previous knowledge of each other, and are exposed to each other only through the game, which may include viewing a photograph or at least knowing the basic criteria for participation (typically participants are not already married).

There have been a number of dating shows aired on television over the years, using a variety of formats and rules. They are presented for the entertainment of the viewers. As the genre progressed, the format developed towards a reality-style show and more into a relationship show than simply finding a mate.

== History ==
The dating game show subgenre has its origins in the United States. The original dating game shows were introduced by television producer and game show creator Chuck Barris. The format of Barris's first dating show, The Dating Game, which premiered in 1965, saw a bachelor or bachelorette ask questions of three singles seen only by the audience. The various suitors were able to describe their rivals in uncomplimentary ways, which made the show work well as a general devolution of dignity. Some of the questions were written to elicit humorous or suggestive answers. Another Barris show, The Newlywed Game, featured recently married couples competing to answer questions about each other's preferences. The couple who knew each other the best would win the game; sometimes others got divorced. Once, someone divorced after appearing on The Newlywed Game got a "second chance" on The Dating Game. Gimmicks were the lifeblood of all such shows, which drew criticisms for instigating disaffection that could not have been affected. Coincidentally, for a while, the series was produced by David M. Greenfield, who over a decade prior, had produced its predecessor, The Dating Game.

The genre waned for a while, but it was later revived by The New Dating Game and the British version Blind Date, and the original shows were popular in reruns, unusual for any game show. Cable television revived some interest in these shows during the 1980s and 1990s, and eventually new shows began to be made along the old concepts. Variations featuring LGBT contestants began to appear on a few specialty channels.

Other shows focused on the conventional blind date, where two people were set up and then captured on video, sometimes with comments or subtitles that made fun of their dating behaviour. He Said, She Said focused not on setting up the date, but on comparing the couple's different impressions afterwards, and for their cooperation offering to fund a second date. These resembled the reality shows that began to emerge at about the same time in the 1990s.

The increased popularity of reality television since the early 2000s has influenced new types of dating shows, where the emphasis is on realistic actions and tensions, but use less realistic scenarios than the traditional blind date:

- Who Wants to Marry a Multi-Millionaire? (2000) a one-off special with a beauty pageant-like contest to become the bride of a single man, billed as a having a net worth of at least $1 million, whose identity was not revealed until the conclusion of the competition.
- Farmer Wants a Wife (2001), where suitors from an urban setting compete for the affection of a group of singles from a rural setting (typically farmers).
- The 5th Wheel (2001), in which four people, two of one sex and two of another, are allowed to meet and bond to an extent, before a "fifth wheel," a person of one of either gender, but always a heterosexual, enters and attempts to break up the equilibrium.
- Temptation Island (2001), where long-standing heterosexual couples were deliberately separated and made to watch each other's mates interacting romantically on and after dates, making extensive use of video—the only means by which they could communicate on the island.
- The Bachelor (2002) and The Bachlorette (2003), where a single man or woman partakes in activities with a larger group of single contestants, eliminating them over the course of the season until one remains.
- Joe Millionaire (2003), a series satirizing shows like The Bachelor, where a group of women competed to become the bride of a bachelor billed as being a millionaire. However, the bachelor was actually a blue collar worker who wasn't a millionaire. If the last remaining woman still accepted his love despite the stunt, they also shared a grand prize of $1 million. A 2022 revival employed two bachelors: one of them was a millionaire, but their identity was not revealed until the conclusion of the competition.
- Are You the One? (2014), a series where a group of singles attempt to deduce their "perfect matches" as determined by producers, for a chance to split a cash prize among themselves.
- Love Island (2015), a series where a group of male and female singles are isolated at a villa in a vacation setting, attempting to form couples while also competing in challenges to earn advantages and the opportunity to go on dates. Couples may also face elimination via viewer vote.

Alongside these reality competitions, there were also other new studio-based formats for dating shows. The 2008 Australian series Taken Out, which was exported internationally to other countries under the title Take Me Out, featured bachelors discussing aspects of their personality and interests with a large pool of singles. The singles could press a button on their podium to eliminate themselves from contention if they were no longer interested in the bachelor, with the game ending if there are no singles remaining.

GSN's Baggage (2010) featured singles presenting personal—and sometimes embarrassing and/or shocking—secrets about themselves (their "baggage", revealed by opening Deal or No Deal-like briefcases) to a bachelor or bachelorette. At the end of each episode, the bachelor or bachelorette must present their own "baggage" to the remaining single, who then chooses whether to accept or decline their offer of a date.

== Commonalities ==
Some common threads run through these shows. When participants are removed, it is usually done one at a time to drag out the action and get audience sympathy for specific players. In shows involving couples, there is a substantial incentive to break up any of the existing relationships. In shows involving singles, there is a mismatch of numbers ensuring constant competition. This creates the action, tension and humiliation when someone is rejected. There are also reports of mercenary practice, that is, members of one sex paid to participate in the game to attain balance of sex ratio.

== Modern innovations ==
By the late 1990s and early 2000s, a new wave of dating shows began airing in American syndication that were more sexually suggestive than their earlier counterparts, including shows such as Blind Date, ElimiDate and The 5th Wheel, which often pushed boundaries of sexual content allowed on broadcast television. As the 2000s progressed, the ratings for many of these shows began to decline, a situation exacerbated by the Super Bowl XXXVIII halftime show controversy in 2004 as production companies out of fear of being imposed with monetary penalties by the Federal Communications Commission (FCC) for indecent content began self-censoring their dating shows (and many syndicated programs targeted at the 18-49 demographic, in general) to levels in which even profanities typically permissible on television were edited out of episodes.

Since then, the game show has virtually died off from television syndication, though cable television networks such as VH1 have continued to air dating shows with content similar to that of the syndicated dating shows of the late 1990s and early 2000s and major over-the-air broadcast networks have tried, often with marginal success, to use dating shows that are less risque compared to those shows. Attempts to revive the dating show in syndication first came in 2011, when Excused and Who Wants to Date a Comedian? both debuted; this was followed in 2012 by NBCUniversal Television Distribution's sale of reruns of the Game Show Network series Baggage into syndication. All three shows were dropped in September 2013, removing the genre from broadcast syndication for a time. In July 2014, VH1 aired Dating Naked, modeled on Dutch show Adam Zkt. Eva, which matches up heterosexual contestants who are nude most of the time.

A popular dating variant of the talk show involved inviting secret admirers to meet on stage. On an episode of The Jenny Jones Show, a gay secret admirer publicly revealed his crush on a straight acquaintance; three days after the episode's taping, the acquaintance murdered the secret admirer, in which he claimed humiliation over the revelation of a same-sex crush. The secret admirer variant of the talk show has remained popular, and it has continued be used on talk shows such as Oprah. Occasional episodes of Maury combine this format, though not always in a direct manner, with reveals of high school classmates who were considered to be unattractive as teenagers reuniting with their former school friends or tormentors as adults, after changing their image to become more physically attractive.

== Criticism ==
Like other games, the outcomes of these activities are open to rigging, leading to missed matches and possibly unhappiness among the participants. These programs have also been criticised for complicating courtship with needless public expectation. In spite of this, some programs have produced episodes that portray follow-ups of unions forged therein, possibly with offspring.

== Partial list of dating game shows ==
- The 5th Wheel
- 12 Corazones
- Are You the One?
- Average Joe
- Baggage (American game show)
- Baggage (British game show)
- The Bachelor
- The Bachelorette
- Beauty and the Geek
- Blind Date (British game show)
- Blind Date (American TV series)
- Boy Meets Boy
- Bzzz!
- Chains of Love
- Change of Heart
- The Choice
- Daisy of Love
- Date My Ex: Jo & Slade
- Date My Mom
- Dating in the Dark
- Dating Game
- Dating Naked
- A Double Shot at Love
- Dismissed
- ElimiDate
- Excused
- Exposed
- EX-treme Dating
- Fei Cheng Wu Rao
- Flavor of Love
- For Love or Money
- For the Love of Ray J
- Frank the Entertainer in a Basement Affair
- He Said, She Said
- I Kissed a Boy
- I Love New York
- Joe Millionaire
- Love Connection
- Love Games: Bad Girls Need Love Too
- The Love Machine
- Love on a Saturday Night
- Love Triangle
- Matchmaker
- The Match Off
- Megan Wants a Millionaire
- MILF Manor
- Momma's Boys
- Must Love Kids
- Perfect Match
- Naked Attraction
- Next
- Outback Jack
- Paradise Hotel
- Ready for Love*
- Real Chance of Love
- The Real Love Boat
- Rendez-View
- Rock of Love with Bret Michaels
- Sexy Beasts
- A Shot at Love with Tila Tequila
- Shipmates
- Singled Out
- Studs
- Susan's The Courtship
- Take Me Out
- Taken Out
- Temptation Island
- The Destined One
- That's Amore!
- Who Wants to Marry a Multi-Millionaire?
- The X Effect
- It's Showtime! segment, "KapareWho"
- It's Showtime! segment, "Nasaan Ka, Mr. Pastillas?"

== See also ==
- Speed dating
