= I Love Money season 4 =

I Love Money
- Season 4
- Presented by: Craig "C.J." Jackson
- No. of contestants: 18
- Winner: Mindy Hall
- Location: Manzanillo, Mexico
- No. of episodes: 12

Release
- Original network: VH1
- Original release: September 16 – December 1, 2010

Season chronology
- ← Previous; Season 2

The fourth season of the VH1 reality television series I Love Money premiered on 16 September 2010. The season's 18 contestants were drawn from I Love New York, Rock of Love, Real Chance of Love, Daisy of Love, Megan Wants a Millionaire, and For the Love of Ray J to compete in physical and mental challenges, aiming for a $250,000 grand prize. The show was reportedly edited in order to focus on the competitions after the murder of Jasmine Fiore. The winner of the competition was Mindy Hall. As of 2026, this was the final season of I Love Money.

== Background ==
The fourth season of the VH1 reality television series I Love Money, created by The Surreal Life executive producers Cris Abrego and Mark Cronin and their company, 51 Minds Entertainment, premiered on 16 September 2010.

The third season was originally slated to air in January 2010, but was pulled from the schedule in 2009 after one of the contestants, Ryan Jenkins, committed suicide after being charged with the murder of his wife, Jasmine Fiore. It subsequently emerged that Jenkins had been convicted of assault in 2007. However, due to an inadequate background check by Straightline International, the firm contracted to vet him, this was not disclosed to VH1 or 51 Minds. According to 51 Minds, had this assault been disclosed, Jenkins would have never been allowed on the show.

The show was reportedly edited in order to focus on the competitions, as VH1 noted they "had a new programming filter in place" in the wake of the Jenkins incident. This was to be the final season of the series.

== Contestants ==
Name	Original series	Team	Eliminated
Mindy Hall	Rock of Love Bus with Bret Michaels	Green	Winner
Christopher "Brooklyn" Cas	Daisy of Love	Gold	Episode 12 (2nd)
Kamille "Hot Wings" Leai	Real Chance of Love 2	Gold	Episode 12 (3rd)
Sharay "Punisher" Hayes	Megan Wants a Millionaire	Gold	Episode 12 (4th)
Chris "6 Gauge" Kummer	Daisy of Love	Green	Episode 11 (5th)
Brittanya O'Campo	Rock of Love Bus with Bret Michaels	Gold	Episode 11 (6th)
Francisco "Cisco" Baserva	Megan Wants a Millionaire	Green	Episode 10 (7th)
Abbi "Corn Fed" Noah	Real Chance of Love	Green	Episode 9 (8th)
Garth McKeown	Megan Wants a Millionaire	Gold	Episode 9 (9th)
Gabrielle "Sassy" Carey	Real Chance of Love 2	Gold	Episode 8 (10th)
Kip "Blonde Baller" Force	Real Chance of Love 2	Gold	Episode 7 (11th)
Elizabeth "Feisty" Mendez	For the Love of Ray J	Green	Episode 6 (12th)
Branden "Chi Chi" Mathena	Daisy of Love	Green	Episode 5 (13th)
Marcia "Brazil" Alves	Rock of Love Bus with Bret Michaels	Green	Episode 4 (14th)
Alex Netto	Megan Wants a Millionaire	Green	Episode 3 (15th)
Nico "20 Pack" Vasquez	I Love New York 2	Gold	Episode 2 (16th)
Michelle "Mamacita" Cruz	Real Chance of Love 2	No Team	Episode 1 (17th)
Matthew "Cheezy" Levy	I Love New York 2	No Team	Episode 1 (18th)

== Episode progress ==
Contestant	Episode												
Contestant	1	2	3	4	5	6	7	8	9	10	11	12	
Mindy	SAFE	WIN	**BTM3**	SAFE	SAFE	BTM3	SAFE	SAFE	BTM3	BTM3	SAFE	BTM3	WINNER
Brooklyn	BTM4	SAFE	WIN	**WIN**	WIN	WIN	SAFE	WIN	SAFE	SAFE	BTM3	WIN	VOID
Hot Wings	SAFE	SAFE	WIN	WIN	WIN	WIN	SAFE	SAFE	WIN	BTM2	BTM2	BTM2	VOID
Punisher	SAFE	SAFE	WIN	WIN	**WIN**	WIN	BTM3	BTM3	SAFE	WIN	WIN	VOID	
6 Gauge	SAFE	WIN	SAFE	SAFE	**SAFE**	SAFE	SAFE	BTM2	SAFE	SAFE	VOID		
Brittanya	SAFE	BTM2	WIN	WIN	WIN	WIN	WIN	SAFE	SAFE	SAFE	VOID		
Francisco	**WIN**	WIN	BTM2	SAFE	BTM2	SAFE	SAFE	SAFE	BTM2	VOID			
Corn Fed	BTM4	WIN	SAFE	BTM3	SAFE	BTM2	SAFE	SAFE	VOID				
Garth	SAFE	BTM3	WIN	WIN	WIN	**WIN**	SAFE	SAFE	VOID				
Sassy	BTM6	SAFE	**WIN**	WIN	WIN	WIN	BTM3	VOID					
Blonde Baller	**WIN**	SAFE	WIN	WIN	WIN	WIN	VOID						
Feisty	SAFE	WIN	SAFE	BTM3	BTM3	**VOID**							
Chi Chi	SAFE	**WIN**	SAFE	SAFE	VOID								
Marcia	SAFE	WIN	SAFE	**VOID**									
Alex	BTM6	WIN	VOID										
20 Pack	SAFE	**VOID**											
Mamacita	VOID												
Cheezy	VOID												

Teams
The contestant was chosen to be on the Gold Team by Blonde Baller.
The contestant was chosen to be on the Green Team by Francisco.
Team captains are noted in bold text. Dead Last Losers are noted in italic text.

Competition Notes
The contestant won the competition.
The contestant was Paymaster.
The contestant was on the winning team and was safe.
The contestant did not win the challenge, but was not chosen to be in the Bottom 3.
The contestant was in the Bottom 3, but was not eliminated.
The contestant was the last to be picked for a team or they were voted into the Bottom 2, but was not eliminated..
The contestant was eliminated, thus their check was voided.
The contestant was last in the challenge and was automatically eliminated.
The contestant received the gold lock and was safe from elimination.

Episode Notes

Episode 1 – Blond Baller and Francisco were the only ones safe from elimination as they were the Team Captains.
Episode 7 – Craig announced there would be no more teams.
Episode 9 – Garth came last in the challenge and was eliminated straight away.
Episode 11 – Brittanya came last in the challenge and was eliminated straight away.
Hot Wings and Brooklyn both made it to the last step of the challenge, with no clear order given.

== Episodes ==
=== Episode 1: Game On! ===
First aired 16 September 2010

- Viewers – 731,000

18 contestants from various "of Love" shows, arrive in Manzanillo, Mexico to compete on the fourth season. Alliances are formed and the backstabbing begins as two money lovers are sent packing on the first night.

Their first challenge is called the "Safe Cracker" it involves the contestants competing in their own sex to spin around a gear which is on top of a safe until it opens, then after it opens they must take out a bag of money from inside the safe and run across to the next safe; the first six contestants to make it this station moves on to the next round of the challenge, while the other three are eliminated. They empty out the money on the top of safe, count how much money there is to find out what the safe combination, unlock the safe, and move on to the next round. The first 3 to move on to the next round are safe whilst the other 3 contestants are eliminated. After the safe is unlocked, they have to run across to a safe and untie the rope holding it down; after the knot is untied, they must lift up the safe in the air with rope and smash it down on the ground so it cracks open. After it opens, the first person to get the detonator, run to the final safe, and blow it up is the winner will be the team captain.

- Challenge: Safe Cracker
- Challenge Winners: Blonde Baller, Francisco
- Eliminated Final Round: Brooklyn, Sassy
- Eliminated Semifinal Round: 20 Pack, 6 Gauge, Brittanya, Chi Chi, Feisty, Hot Wings, Marcia, Punisher
- Eliminated First Round: Alex, Cheezy, Corn Fed, Garth, Mamacita, Mindy
- Gold Team: Blonde Baller, 20 Pack, Hot Wings, Punisher, Brittanya, Garth, Sassy, Brooklyn
- Green Team: Francisco, Mindy, 6 Gauge, Marcia, Chi-Chi, Feisty, Alex, Corn Fed
- Bottom 6: Alex, Brooklyn, Cheezy, Sassy, Mamacita, Corn Fed
- Eliminated: Cheezy, Mamacita

Episode Notes

- This is the first time on I Love Money, where two people go home on the first night.

Reasons for Elimination

- Cheezy: Even though Blonde Baller told him she would pick him on her team, she picked Brooklyn because she thought he was stronger.
- Mamacita: Francisco said Corn Fed was more mentally stable than Mamacita.

=== Episode 2: Bermuda Love Triangle ===
First aired 23 September 2010

- Viewers – 554,000

The 16 remaining contestants compete in the "Taste My Kiss" challenge. Meanwhile, Chi Chi, Brittanya and 20 Pack are tangled in a love triangle and the end result sends shock waves through the house.

Team	Round 1			Round 2		
Team	Peanut Butter	Bacon	Olives	Relish	Onions	Coffee
Green	✓	✓	✓	✓	✓	✓
Gold	✓	✗	✗	✓	✓	✗

- Challenge: Taste My Kiss
- Team Captains: 20 Pack & Chi Chi
- Winner: Green Team
- Loser: Gold Team
- Pay Master: Chi Chi
- Bottom 3: 20 Pack, Brittanya, Garth
- Eliminated: 20 Pack

Episode Notes

- Captains are chosen by Craig by having each team members' names written on ping pong balls and drawn at random from individual bags. The losing team captain is automatically up for elimination. Once selected captain they cannot be selected again.

Reasons for Elimination

- 20 Pack: After finding Brittanya in 20 Pack's bed at the beginning of the episode, Chi Chi wanted to send her home. His team, on the other hand, wanted 20 Pack to go home because he is the stronger player in the game. During the Power Outing and Elimination, 20 and Brittanya both gave Chi Chi reasons why they should stay. In the end even though Brittanya cheated on him with 20 Pack, he decided to send 20 Pack home because Brittanya has a son and Chi Chi still had feelings for her. 20 Pack said if he ever sees Chi Chi in Chicago there will be problems.

=== Episode 3: Bedlam ===
First aired 30 September 2010

- Viewers – 651,000

As Punisher becomes top dog in the house, the girls form a "Flower Power" alliance to try and throw out all of the strong male contestants. But, tensions rise at elimination when Sassy deliberates looking out for herself or looking out for her team.

Green Team		Gold Team	
Name	Time	Name	Time
Francisco	10.1	Garth	18.9
Mindy	24.0	Brittanya	30.6
6 Gauge	18.6	Hot Wings	21.2
Alex	15.9	Sassy	14.8
Marcia	40.2	Brooklyn	10.1
Feisty	40.4	Blonde Baller	60 (DQ)
Chi Chi	8.3	Punisher	9.5
Corn Fed	60 (DNF)		
Average	27.2	Average	23.6

The contestant was disqualified.
The contestant did not finish the challenge.
The contestant won the Gold Lock.

- Challenge: Bed Hopping
- Team Captains: Mindy, Sassy
- Winner: Gold Team
- Loser: Green Team
- Gold Lock: Chi Chi
- Pay Master: Sassy
- Bottom 3: Alex, Francisco, Mindy
- Eliminated: Alex

Episode Notes

- On this season, the player that has the overall best score on select challenges will win a Gold Lock. This lock will give them immunity even if their team loses the challenge.
- Mindy, Marcia, Corn Fed and Feisty create the "Flower Power" alliance, so they can work together to get the strong competitors out.
- The Bed Hopping challenge was also used on tenth episode of "I Love Money 2".
- For the challenge if a contestant fell into the water their time is automatically 60 seconds. The maximum of time giving was 60 seconds to complete the challenge.

Reasons for Elimination

- Alex: When Sassy found out Alex had an alliance with Punisher (who is on the Gold Team), she wanted to send him home. The Gold Team however, wants Francisco to go home since he is the biggest threat for their team. She ends up eliminating Alex because Francisco offered to save her anytime she is in the strong box. This causes a riot between her and her team, and Hot Wings tries to fight her.

=== Episode 4: Tequila Girls Gone Wild ===
First aired – 6 October 2010

- Viewers – 596,000
- VH1 moved the premiere of new episodes from Thursdays at 11:00 pm to Wednesdays at 11:00 pm.

After they come back from elimination, Sassy and Hot Wings sort things out and she explains why she sent Alex home. In the morning, Craig chooses the two people who will be captains from the bag and the Green team captain is Marcia, the Gold team captain is Brooklyn. When they get to the site of the challenge, they see two mannequins standing on a platform in the water wearing a giant bottom apparatus. Craig then tells them on the "of love" shows there is always one girl with a huge bum. He then goes on to say that the challenge is called "Junk in the Trunk"; it then shows a clip of Brittanya's big bum. What they have to do is go on the platform against someone else on the opposing team that is the same sex, wear the giant bum apparatus and fight each other only with apparatus the first person to fall off the platform loses and the winner gets a point for their team. After five rounds the team with the most points win the challenge. First up is Hot wings vs Mindy; Mindy is worried that because Hot wings has a huge butt she will probably win. They both get off to a great start and both put up a great fight but Hot wings manages to just knock off Mindy. Next up is Garth vs Chi Chi the gold team believes that Garth will easily beat chi chi due to the weight factor. When versing, Garth straight away knock Chi Chi to the ground and states that he has a lot of anger towards Chi Chi due to before saying that Garth was an idiot at the elimination when he was Paymaster. Garth just keeps banging Ch Chi but does not attempt to knock him off the platform. Chi Chi then gets up and knocks Garth off the platform scoring for his team. Next is Sassy vs Marcia they are both evenly matched and Marcia thinks it will be very close whilst Sassy is more confident that she will win. When versing their fight goes for a while and they both try easily hard to knock the other one off. Eventually they both fall off Sassy falls backwards off and marcia falls feet first. After Craig checks the video it is shown that Marcia did hit the water first declaring Sassy the winner. Next up is the biggest guys in the house Punisher vs 6 Gauge, They both have a huge brawl but in the end Punisher was just able to push 6 Gauge of the over edge declaring Punisher the Winner. Next up is Blond Baller vs Corn Fed; straight away Blond Baller does one little tiny bump up against Corn Fed and she straight away falls off and loses. Leaving the Gold team with a score of 4 to 1 leaving them as the winners and Brooklyn the Paymaster and making Marcia put in the box.

Round	Match-up	Winner
1	Mindy vs. Hot Wings	Hot Wings
2	Chi-Chi vs. Garth	Chi-Chi
3	Marcia vs. Sassy	Sassy
4	6 Gauge vs. Punisher	Punisher
5	Corn Fed vs. Blonde Baller	Blonde Baller

After the Green team lose for the second time, they talk about who they're planning to vote for in the vault. Marcia, Feisty, Corn Fed and Mindy at first say they're going to vote for 6 gauge and Francisco. 6 Gauge then gets furious and storms out. Marcia and Feisty leave the room thinking that their alliance with Corn Fed and Mindy are going to stick together and vote for the guys. 6 Gauge comes back in after and tells them that there is no way any of them are going to make it far into the game if they all keep putting the strongest people in the box and as they will not win any challenges if the weaker people just stick around in the team. This ends up persuading everyone to not vote for the guys, although Marcia and Feisty do not know any of this as they are not in the room and are not told of this. In the vault Feisty gets voted in the box and so does Corn Fed. This infuriates Marcia she ends up having a huge fight with Mindy saying that she is not loyal and a backstabbing liar who turned her back on their alliance and agreement whilst being naked. On the power outing Marcia and feisty have a huge argument with Corn Fed this causes Brooklyn to not even be able to speak or say anything. Finally Brooklyn has a one on one with Feisty and she talks about how Corn Fed is not loyal and talks about the alliance she had and how Mindy and Corn Fed went back on the alliance they had, She also says that she would be willing to throw the team challenges for him whilst their talking, Marcia breaks down in front of Corn Fed saying how betrayed she feels as she thought they were friends and she would go away from this experience even if she did not win feeling like she had mad some really good friends. After the power outing, Marcia says to Chi Chi that your father's laughing at you as Chi Chi's dad is dead, Which makes Chi Chi emotional and Brooklyn who over hears does get emotional as well as his dad is dead. At the elimination they all get their final pleas Feisty and Marcia basically state that their loyal unlike Corn Fed and will always have Brooklyn's back if he saves them. Corn Fed states that she was loyal to her team like Brooklyn is and she had to do what she had to do. Brooklyn then calls up Marcia saying that he had heard her saying some really personal things to Chi Chi about his deceased Father. Which Brooklyn got says he got offended by that since his dad is dead. He then asks Craig to void her check. Marcia is then very sad by her elimination but says she was happy she met a great friend Feisty. Feisty then states she is going to win the money for Marcia

- Challenge: Junk in the Trunk
- Team Captains: Brooklyn, Marcia
- Winner: Gold Team
- Loser: Green Team
- Gold Lock: None
- Pay Master: Brooklyn
- Bottom 3: Corn Fed, Feisty, Marcia
- Eliminated: Marcia

Reasons for Elimination

- Marcia: After the Power Outting, Marcia argues with Mindy and Chi Chi. During the argument, she talks about Chi Chi and his deceased father, which bothers Brooklyn. He sends her home at elimination because as he stated on the first episode, his dad is deceased also and he felt that her comments to Chi Chi showed him her true colors.

=== Episode 5: It's All Part of the Game ===
First aired 13 October 2010

- Viewers – 442,000.
- VH1 moved the premiere of new episodes again from Wednesdays at 11:00 pm to Wednesdays at 10:00 pm. This now rivals MTV's hit show The Challenge: Cutthroat (a similar show with the same concept), causing a ratings showdown between the two shows.

The Punisher starts to take control of the house and plans to take out Chi Chi and Francisco out. Craig picks out the team captains, The green team's captain is 6 Gauge, The Gold team's captain is Punisher. Sassy, Blond Baller and Hot Wings and members of the Green team are all extremely happy to hear that Punisher is team captain as they know now all they have to throw the challenge so he will go in the box automatically. When they get to their challenge they see a huge like tower with stairs and balance beams. craig tells them that this challenge is based on the moment of Real Chance of Love 2 where the girls sang the "save the Animals song" and that is what the challenge is called. One by one they must climb a ladder, walk across a beam, grab 2 animals out of a box, climb up another ladder, walk across a much smaller beam, climb up a ladder on the other side, walk across another beam and grab another animal out of a box after they have three animals their time stops. The team with lowest average of time wins the challenge. Sassy, Blond Baller and Hot wings see this now as prefect opportunity to throw the challenge, until Craig tells them that there is a Gold lock up at stake. This screws up their plan as they know Punisher will probably get the Gold Lock if their team loses and he will be safe, so they have try now to do well at the challenge. Brittanya goes first for the Gold Team, and Mindy goes first for the Green Team. Mindy starts off strong and finishes with a time of 1:26, whilst Brittanya is afraid of heights and ends up taking all the time and her time automatically is 4:00. Francisco and Sassy go next Francisco finishes with a time of 1:26, whilst Sassy ends up having trouble due to her fear of heights but eventually pulls through and finishes with a time of 2:19. 6 Gauge and Blond Baller go next 6 Gauge goes extremely fast on the course and has no trouble and finishes with a time of 0.48 seconds, Blond Baller gets a good time of 1:32. Feisty and Hot Wings go next feisty starts off well but she has trouble with the top part of the last ladder and ends up falling off and smacking her head twice against the poles giving her a time of 4:00 whilst Hot wings Does a lot better with a time of 1:25. Corn Fed and Garth go next Corn Fed does well at the start until she walks across to the small beams and falls off giving her a time of 4:00 as well, Garth gets a time of 1:20. Next is Chi Chi and Brooklyn Chi Chi runs extremely fast up the course but forgets to get the first two animals but then goes back down really fast and manages to finish with a fast time of 0.56, Brooklyn goes extremely fast and finishes with the same time as Chi Chi. Last up is Punisher and finishes with a time of 1:00. Craig then tells them the average of the Green Team is 2:07 and the Gold Teams is 1:47. Making the Gold team the winner and Punisher the Paymaster, and the green team loses for the third time now since 6 Gauge had the lowest time for his team he gets the Gold Lock and is automatically safe.

Green Team		Gold Team	
Name	Time	Name	Time
Mindy	1:26	Brittanya	4:00 (DNF)
Francisco	1:30	Sassy	2:19
6 Gauge	0:48	Blonde Baller	1:32
Feisty	4:00 (DQ)	Hot Wings	1:25
Corn Fed	4:00 (DQ)	Garth	1:20
Chi-Chi	0:56	Brooklyn	0:56
		Punisher	1:00
Average	2:07	Average	1:47

The contestant was disqualified.
The contestant did not finish the challenge.
The contestant won the Gold Lock.

- Challenge: Save The Animals
- Team Captains: 6 Gauge, Punisher
- Winner: Gold Team
- Loser: Green Team
- Gold Lock: 6 Gauge
- Pay Master: Punisher
- Bottom 3: Chi Chi, Feisty, Francisco
- Eliminated: Chi Chi

Episode Notes

- In this challenge the maximum time allowed was 4:00, and anyone who fell off the support beams times were automatically 4:00.

Reasons for Elimination

- Chi Chi: After the challenge Chi Chi and Punisher almost get into an altercation, making Chi Chi vow to get him out of the house. At the Power Outing Chi Chi apologizes to Punisher, saying that he does not hate him, he will not send him home if he's the paymaster and he will have his back for the rest of the game. Punisher is hesitant of believing him and sends him home during elimination since he thought it was all an act.

=== Episode 6: Millionaires Making Moves ===
First aired 20 October 2010

- Viewers: 423,000

As the Gold Team continues there winning streak, Punisher, Francisco and Garth get Feisty to turn on her whole team to save themselves once again. When Feisty thinks she's in the clear to stay, things change when Mindy tries to persuade Garth otherwise.

- Challenge: Brains & Brawns
- Team Captains: Feisty, Garth
- Winner: Gold Team
- Loser: Green Team
- Gold Lock: None
- Pay Master: Garth
- Bottom 3: Corn Fed, Feisty, Mindy
- Eliminated: Feisty

Reasons For Elimination

- Feisty: At the Power Outting, Mindy helped Garth realize that she was more reliable than Feisty was in the game. She would help him more when the challenges become individual and would save him when she could. Garth could not decide who he wanted to send home at elimination. He called Feisty to get her check first, only to send he back. He then gave the first check to Mindy and the last check to Corn Fed, thus eliminating Feisty.

=== Episode 7: Battle of the Blonde Backstabber ===
First aired 27 October 2010

- Viewers: 664,000

In the morning, Craig tells the contestants there are no more teams and that they will be competing as individuals from here on out, and then they are given different colour tops to wear. Blonde Baller has huge target on her back as the male alliance wants her out. Sassy tries to help out Blonde Baller to take the target off her back and get rid of Punisher. When they get to the challenge, Craigs tells them the challenge is called "Talk to the Hand" which is based on moments of the "of love" shows where as soon as there is an argument the hands always go up, there is clip that shows Junk having a fight with Blonde Baller and her hand going up. What they have to do is put on a giant glove which is strapped to a vat above full of what Craig calls "Nastiness." If they drop their hand, the vat tips on them. The person to hold their hand up the longest is paymaster, while the first person to drop their hand is automatically put in the box. Straight away with the challenge, Garth and Punisher keep tormenting Blonde Baller so that she will crack or get distracted so that her hand falls but all that does is distract Punisher so his hand drops and the vat falls on him, making him the dead last loser. He does not worry though, because he knows that his alliance has his back. However, Brooklyn and 6 gauge soon drop their arms which worries Punisher. Blonde Baller makes a comment about Garth's mother which offends him, as he says he is a mama's boy. This motivates Garth to keep his hand up longer to win the challenge and void Blonde Baller's check. Then Francisco drops his arm followed by Hot wings as she outs two arms which makes the vat drop. They then reach the 25-minute mark and six of them still have their hands up. Brittanya asks Punisher, "Why did you have drop your arm? Now I have to keep my arm up longer." The hour goes past and Corn Fed then drops her arm. Sassy then decides to give out which annoys Blonde Baller, as she needed Sassy or herself to win so she will be safe. Mindy then drops her arm, then Blonde Baller's arm drops, which excites Punisher. Garth then asks Brittanya to drop her arm so he can be paymaster but Brittanya says no and Garth's arm drops, so Brittanya wins the challenge and becomes paymaster.

Place	Contestant
1	Brittanya
2	Garth
3	Blonde Baller
4	Mindy
5	Sassy
6	Corn Fed
7	Hot Wings
8	Francisco
9	6 Gauge
10	Brooklyn
11	Punisher

The contestant won the challenge and became Paymaster.
The contestant lost the challenge, but did not finish in last place.
The contestant finished in last place and their check was automatically placed in the strong box.

Punisher is very happy with the outcome of the challenge because he knows he won't go home. Blonde Baller, knowing she has a target on her back, asks Brittanya if she has a problem with her and Brittanya says, "I'm sick of hearing you talking shit so maybe," but Brittanya is not 100% sure she will send Blonde Baller home. Later on, Brittanya tells Sassy that she really likes Francisco which excites Sassy because Sassy sees this as an opportunity to save Blonde Baller. Sassy tries to get Brittanya and Francisco close to each other which works. She then leaves them alone and tells Blonde Baller that she might be safe, and says that "Brittanya actually being a ho might save us." Francisco and Brittanya start hooking up. Whilst that is going on, Mindy and Corn Fed spy on them to see what's going on. Mindy gets very frustrated and angry as she likes Francisco and she thought he had feelings for her as well. Later on, Brittanya and Francisco go into the bathroom and presumably have sex. When Francisco comes back, Mindy is furious with him and tells him how she feels. In the morning when Punisher hears of this, he gets really pissed off as he thought Brittanya liked him. Punisher then gets angry at Brittanya which makes her angry and she considers eliminating him. In the Vault, everyone votes for Blonde Baller to go in the box except for Sassy and Hot Wings as they're in an alliance with Blonde Baller. Sassy gets four votes but only from the guys (except for Francisco). No one else is voted for. On the power outing, Blonde Baller and Punisher are worried and both plead their cases. Blonde Baller says that if Brittanya saves her, she will have her alliance's back. Brittanya is unmoved and unconvinced by Blonde Baller's plea. Punisher states that he and Brittanya have an alliance and he is sorry for what happened before. At elimination, Brittanya announces that she slept with Francisco, which shocks the cast and humiliates Mindy. Sassy believes that it will be down to her best friend in the house (Blonde Baller) and her worst enemy in the house (Punisher). Brittanya calls up Blonde Baller and says "I'm sick of my hearing my name in your bitch face, so Craig, void that check." This makes Punisher and Garth extremely happy, but worries Sassy, who knows she is the next target.

- Challenge: Talk to the Hand
- Winner/Paymaster: Brittanya
- Loser: Punisher
- Bottom 3: Blonde Baller, Punisher, Sassy
- Eliminated: Blonde Baller

Episode Notes

- Craig announced at the beginning of the episode that there will be no more teams.
- All of the contestants were given different colored shirts for the individual challenges.

Color
6 Gauge
Blonde Baller
Brittanya
Brooklyn
Corn Fed
Francisco
Garth
Hot Wings
Mindy
Punisher
Sassy

Reasons For Elimination

- Blonde Baller: Brittanya said no one in the house likes her, and that she had enough of Blonde Baller talking crap about her behind her back.

=== Episode 8: It's a Man's World, You're Just a Visitor in It ===
First aired 3 November 2010

- Viewers: 413,000

With Blonde Baller eliminated, Sassy becomes the next target of the male alliance. The girls plan to take a strong male out of the competition. But, when two "Daisy of Love" rivals face off, they may not need a plan after all.

- Challenge: Mud Slingers
- Winner/Paymaster: Brooklyn
- Loser: Sassy
- Bottom 3: 6Gauge, Punisher, Sassy
- Eliminated: Sassy

Episode Notes

- In this challenge the competitors jump into a mud pit, once in the pit they pick up a ball to be thrown at a target of the competitors. Each target has three hit points, the head and both arms. Once all three hit points are knocked up the competitor cannot be paymaster; however, they are still able to knock out the other targets.

Reasons For Elimination

- Sassy: After giving Punisher the first check, Brooklyn called up 6Gauge up to the stand. Brooklyn says that since the guys helped him become paymaster, he realized 6Gauge was trustworthy and saved him for that. This causes all the guys to cheer about Sassy getting eliminated, which pisses the girls off. Corn Fed ends up yelling at Punisher "You're going down bitch." After seeing how the guys react, Brooklyn got disappointed at their behavior and wished he eliminated 6Gauge instead because Brooklyn had thoughts of eliminating 6Gauge to get back at him for telling Daisy that he had a girlfriend back home.

=== Episode 9: Dealing with the Devil ===
First aired 10 November 2010

- Viewers: 736,000

Due to the shock of Sassy's elimination the girls are very sad as now they are not in control of the game and Punishers alliance is. Hot Wings especially fears as she becomes the next target of the male alliance. When they get to the site of their challenge they see stripper polls hanging up in the air. Craig then tells them that the challenge is called the "pole dance" (this challenge was also used on the first season of i love money). The person that hangs up on the pole the longest is the paymaster whilst the first person to fall off the pole like in season 1 is automatically eliminated. Everyone gets off to a good start on the pole Corn Fed feels that this is a good opportunity to get rid of a guy. About a minute into it Francisco tries to climb up the pole which stuffs up his position and starts to make him slide more down to the bottom of the pole. Garth realises that he put his leg in the wrong position and starts to slide down the pole and eventually he falls off making him the dead last loser and automatically eliminated. Francisco then falls off knowing his safe not long after. Punisher feels extremely sad about Garth getting eliminated and ends up losing focus and slides off the pole. 6 Gauge's arms and legs start feeling really tired so he drops off. Leaving Brooklyn the only guy left on the pole, which makes his alliance hope that he can hold on and become paymaster. Brittanya slides down the pole and worries that if she falls of the pole she will drown cause she does not know how to swim, that motivates her to hold up longer on the pole. Corn Fed starts to get tired and notices that Hot Wings and Mindy look very comfortable on the pole and feels safe as she knows that if one of them is Paymaster she will be safe, and sees that Brittanya will probably fall off soon, she then takes herself off. Brittanya ends up falling off the pole. Brooklyn, Hot Wings and Mindy all maintain comfortable positions on the pole although they do start to feel a lot of pain. Brooklyn tries to hang on as longs as he can but can not end up doing so and falls off the pole, which leaves the final two Hot Wings and Mindy. Hot WIngs then asks Mindy to let her be Paymaster so she can void Punishers check as he would be extremely angry if she did. Mindy feels unsure at first to trust Hot Wings as she thinks Hot Wings might not save her. After Hot Wings swears on most of her families life to save Mindy she finally gets off the pole and makes Hot Wings paymaster.

Rank	Name	Time
1	Hot Wings	16:50
2	Mindy	16:41
3	Brooklyn	9:48
4	Brittanya	6:22
5	Corn Fed	4:50
6	6 Gauge	3:18
7	Punisher	2:44
8	Francisco	2:07
9	Garth	1:45

The contestant won the challenge and became Paymaster.
The contestant lost the challenge, but did not finish in last place.
The contestant placed last in the challenge, and their check was automatically voided.

On the way back to the house Corn Fed, Mindy and Hot Wings try to persuade Brittanya to vote everyone in the male alliance in the box. Brittanya agrees into voting for them. Hot Wings asks Francisco to vote for the guys as they need the votes to swing their way and also for the fact that Francisco is not in the male alliance as his enemy is Punisher. He then agrees to voting for them. Also he decides to vote with them knowing that he has a huge target on his back. In the vault Francisco keeps his word and votes for all the guys along with Corn Fed and Mindy but Brittanya goes back on her word and ends up voting with the guys for Corn Fed, Mindy and Francisco. In the end Corn Fed, Mindy and Francisco all have 4 votes each whilst the guys and Brittanya only have 3 votes putting Francisco, Mindy and Corn Fed in the box. On the power outing they all plead their case, Mindy says she made her word to saving her and is an alliance with her, Corn Fed says that she is also in an alliance with her and she should not be eliminated, Francisco says that he and her are a strong target to be sent home and that she should save him cause if he goes home she will be the main target in the house whether if he is there he will be a more stronger target to be sent home and she will end up being safe. After the power outing Punisher goes up to Hot Wings and offers her to be a replacement for Garth in his alliance if she sends Francisco home, Hot Wings considers it but is not completely sure yet whom to send home. At elimination Hot Wings calls up Mindy first and saves her as she was loyal and he made a promise to Mindy. Next called up is Corn Fed, she feels she is safe as they are in an alliance, But Hot Wings says to her "You're the male alliance's pawn they will always put you in the box to save one of their own" and tells craig to void her check. Hot Wings said sorry to her, but she did feel a bit betrayed. When Francisco came up Hot Wings explained why she had saved him which was what he said before about them being the big targets and her being safe if it ever comes down to the two of them up for elimination. After Francisco gets his check he says to Punisher "i'm like that herpes on your lip that you got from one of your clients that keeps coming back" in response Punisher says "I control you" It is now in the house Mindy, Hot Wings and Francisco vs Punisher, Brooklyn, 6 Gauge and Brittanya.

- Challenge: The Pole Dance
- Winner/Paymaster: Hot Wings
- Loser/Eliminated: Garth
- Bottom 3: Corn Fed, Francisco, Mindy
- Eliminated: Corn Fed

Episode Notes

- The Pole Dance challenge was also used during episode ten of "I Love Money", season one.
- While on the poles, Hot Wings promised Mindy immunity if she let her win the challenge. The same thing happened on season one during The Pole Dance challenge, when Hoopz promised Megan immunity if she let her win. On both seasons, the paymasters did not go back on their promises.

Reasons For Elimination

- Garth: Garth came in last place in the challenge.
- Corn Fed: Hot Wings eliminated Corn Fed because she was basically the male alliance's pawn. Francisco and Hot Wings are their main targets, and they will always put Corn Fed in the strong box to save someone from their alliance.

=== Episode 10: A Date With Destiny ===
First aired 17 November 2010

- Viewers: 529,000

Francisco and Punisher go head-to-head to find out who will go home first. Meanwhile, Hot Wings and Mindy's alliance crumbles apart when both of their checks are put in the strong box.

Place	Contestant
1	Punisher
2	Hot Wings
3	6 Gauge
4	Francisco
5	Brooklyn
6	Brittanya
7	Mindy

The contestant won the challenge and became Paymaster.
The contestant lost the challenge, but did not finish in last place.
The contestant finished in last place and their check was automatically placed in the strong box.

- Challenge: Anybody's Guess
- Winner/Paymaster: Punisher
- Loser: Mindy
- Bottom 3: Francisco, Hot Wings, Mindy
- Eliminated: Francisco

Challenge Rules

- In this challenge the contestants plays a guessing game where Craig ask a series of questions where they would have to guess the closes to the actual amount. The contestant who was the most off from the actual answer would be eliminated from the round.

Reasons For Elimination

- Francisco: Punisher felt that he was the biggest competition and they each had it out for each other from "Megan Wants A Millionaire". At the previous elimination, Francisco said that it was his destiny to void Punisher's check. Punisher said it wasn't his destiny to void Francisco's check because Craig is the person who voids checks, so he tells Craig to void his check.

=== Episode 11: Eat Your Heart Out ===
First aired 24 November 2010

- Viewers: 544,000

After elimination everyone is sitting down together celebrating that they made it into the top 6, except for Mindy who is still angry at the fact that at elimination Hot Wings said she could kill her. They end up having a huge fight about it and are no longer in an alliance. In the morning craig tells them that at the end of the today's challenge one of the contestants will not return this does fear the contestants especially Brittanya as she knows she is probably the weakest girl hear. Punisher feels that 6 Gauge has just been using him to get far in the game which Punisher is not happy about. When they get to their challenge they see a huge table full of food. Craig tells them that " Do you remember on Flavor of Love 1 when New York's Mum (Sister Patterson) had said to New York that she had gained a lot of weight since being on the show". He then tells them the challenge is called "The of love 15" where they are given 20 minutes to each as much food as they can, after the 20 minutes is up they are all weighed in and see how much weight they have gained, the person who gains the most body percentage of weight wins the challenge and becomes Paymaster whether the person who gains the least amount of body percentage of weight is automatically eliminated. If they feel like they are going to vomit or can not eat anymore they are allowed to weigh in before the 20 minutes is up and they are not allowed to continue or weigh in after. They all weigh in to see how much they are Punisher weighs 212.8Ibs, Mindy weighs 114Ibs, Brooklyn weighs 203.6Ibs, Hot Wings weighs 133.8Ibs, 6 Gauge weighs 221.6 and Brittanya weighs 123.8. Punisher tells Brittanya to drink as much water as she can as he knows it weighs a lot and it will help them both gain heaps of weight. Everyone starts to grab heaps of food Punisher grabs a huge bowl of Spaghetti with lots of bottles of water to drink from. Hot Wings takes a huge big cake and nearly eats the whole thing. Brooklyn grabs lots of meat as he thinks that meat weighs a lot. Brittanya finds it hard to eat so much and drink so much water so she just cuts down to eating little food like Hot dogs. Mindy has a huge platter of all different kinds of food and decides to mush it all together. 6 Gauge eats every different type of thing on the table. Hot Wings after 10 minutes feels as if she is going to vomit and gives out and weighs in, at 137.2Ibs gaining 3.4Ibs and ends up vomiting up a bit of the food. After drinking over 6 bottles of water and a bowl of Spaghetti Punisher decides to weigh in with 8 minutes to go at 220.8 gaining 8 lbs. Brooklyn gets really sick and decides to weigh in, his weight is 209.2Ibs gaining 5.6Ibs he ends up vomiting continuously for the duration of time. Brittanya ends up weighing in, she weighs 125.8Ibs gaining only 2Ibs. The time runs out and Mindy weighs in at 117.2Ilbs gaining 3.2Ibs. 6 Gauge weighs in at 225.8Ibs gaining 4.2Ibs. Craig then tells them that the body percentage weight gained by everybody is, Punisher 3.7%, Mindy 2.8%, 6 Gauge 1.9%, Brooklyn 2.7%, Brittanya 1.6% and lastly Hot Wings who Mindy and Brittanya think will go as they she gave out early in the challenge percentage gained was 2.5%. As Brittanya lost the least Craig voided her check straight away.

Place	Contestant	Old Weight (lbs.)	New Weight (lbs.)	Gained (lbs.)	Body Weight Increase
1	Punisher	212.8	220.8	8	3.7%
2	Mindy	114	117.2	3.2	2.8%
3	Brooklyn	203.6	209.2	5.6	2.7%
4	Hot Wings	133.8	137.2	3.4	2.5%
5	6 Gauge	221.6	225.8	4.2	1.9%
6	Brittanya	123.8	125.8	2	1.6%

The contestant won the challenge and became Paymaster.
The contestant lost the challenge, but did not finish in last place.
The contestant placed last in the challenge, and their check was automatically voided.

- Challenge: The "Of Love" 15
- Winner/Paymaster: Punisher
- Loser/Eliminated: Brittanya
- Bottom 3: 6 Gauge, Brooklyn, Hot Wings
- Eliminated: 6 Gauge

Episode Notes

- Punisher became paymaster in this episode making him the first back-to-back paymaster of the season.

Reasons for Elimination

- Brittanya: Brittanya came in last place in the challenge.
- 6 Gauge: Punisher felt that 6 Gauge was riding his coattails the whole show to get to where he was in the game. Punisher said he used him as mole just to see where his head was at, while even though Hot Wings wasn't in his alliance, Punisher gave her credit for him getting far because she helped him win team challenges.

=== Episode 12: The Final Race ===
First aired 1 December 2010

- Viewers: 541,000
- The finale aired at 9:00 pm instead of 10:00 pm, to make way for the fourth season of Celebrity Rehab with Dr. Drew.

Rank	Name	Time
1	Brooklyn	0:33
2	Punisher	0:34
3	Mindy	0:42
4	Hot Wings	DQ

The contestant won the challenge and became Paymaster.
The contestant lost the challenge, but did not finish in last place.
The contestant was disqualified from the competition.

- Challenge: Smash The Homies
- Winner/Paymaster: Brooklyn
- Bottom 3: Hot Wings, Mindy, Punisher
- Eliminated: Punisher
- Final Challenge: The Run for the Money
- Runners-up: Brooklyn, Hot Wings
- Winner: Mindy

Reasons for Elimination

- Punisher: Brooklyn said he did not really need the money as much as the other two did. (as a small note, Punisher did admit that the previous I Love Money winners were females, so he wanted to break that cycle and wanted to be the first male to win. Also Punisher wholeheartely admits that no one in the house could truly defeat him.)
- Brooklyn & Hot Wings: Both lost out to Mindy in the last challenge.
