= Real Chance of Love season 2 =

Real Chance of Love
- Season 2
- The Cast of Real Chance of Love 2: Back in the Saddle
- Starring: Kamal Givens; Ahmad Givens
- No. of episodes: 12

Release
- Original network: VH1
- Original release: August 3 – October 26, 2009

Season chronology
- ← Previous; Season 1

Real Chance of Love 2: Back in the Saddle is the second season of the VH1 reality television dating series Real Chance of Love. Ahmad Givens (Real) and Kamal Givens (Chance), former contestants on I Love New York are the central figures. The show premiered August 3, 2009. The show features twenty female contestants taking part in various challenges. Real and Chance appeared on Chelsea Lately on May 25, 2009, to talk about the second season of the series, which was in production at the time. Ultimately, Ahmad (Real) selected Doll, while Kamal (Chance) selected Hot Wings.

== Contestants ==
Nickname	Real name	Hometown	Age	Eliminated
Doll	Jackie DaFonseca	Boston, Massachusetts	23	Winner (Real's choice)
Hot Wings	Kamille Leai	Washington, D.C.	22	Winner (Chance's choice)
Mamacita	Michelle Cervantes	Mexico/San Diego, California	27	Episode 12
Sassy	Gabrielle Carey	Detroit, Michigan	22	Episode 12
Pocahontas	Nancy Rodriguez	Orange County, California	29	Episode 12
Baker	Tamara Moore	Kansas City, Missouri	24	Episode 10
Flirty	Amparo Rosa	Buffalo, New York	23	Episode 9
Classy	Kaylana Reese	Miami, Florida	24	Episode 9
Blonde Baller	Kip Force	Fullerton, California	23	Episode 8
Spanish Fly	Shirley Alvarez	Turlock, California	23	Episode 7
PS	Tricia Higgins	Topeka, Kansas	27	Episode 6 (Quit)
Junk	Myrline Richards	Salisbury, North Carolina	25	Episode 5
Lady	Dolly Gray	Houston, Texas	21	Episode 5
Apple	Diana Hughes	Hobart, Indiana	23	Episode 4
Aloha	Raschelle Rawlins	Waiʻanae, Hawaii	23	Episode 3
Wiggly	Kayla Baker	Pittsburgh, Pennsylvania	21	Episode 2
Freckles	Jennifer Antoinette	Washington, D.C.	25	Episode 1
Ribbon	Olympia Norris	Shreveport, Louisiana	21	Episode 1
Vegas	Tina Ulman	Las Vegas, Nevada	27	Episode 1 (Disqualified)
Show Me	Amber Mountjoy	Kansas City, Missouri	22	Episode 1 (Disqualified)

== Elimination Order ==
Real & Chance's Call-out Order
#	Contestants	Episodes											
#	Contestants	1	2	3	4	5	6	7	8	9	10	12	
1	Aloha	Hot Wings	Sassy^{1}	Baker^{2}	PS^{1}	PS	Blonde Baller^{2}	Hot Wings^{2}	Sassy^{1}	Pocahontas^{1}	Mamacita	Mamacita	Doll
2	Apple	Aloha	Spanish Fly^{2}	Doll	Baker^{2}	Hot Wings	Mamacita	Doll^{1}	Hot Wings	Mamacita^{2}	Hot Wings	Hot Wings	Hot Wings
3	Baker	Spanish Fly	Doll	Hot Wings	Doll^{1}	Sassy^{1}	Baker^{2}	Mamacita	Doll	Doll	Doll	Sassy	Mamacita
4	Blonde Baller	Classy	Blonde Baller^{2}	Lady	Hot Wings	Blonde Baller	Classy	Classy^{1}	Baker	Hot Wings	Pocahontas	Doll	Sassy
5	Classy	Flirty	Baker	Spanish Fly	Classy	Doll	Doll	Baker	Pocahontas	Sassy	Sassy	Pocahontas	
6	Doll	Sassy	Hot Wings	Pocahontas	Flirty	Baker	Flirty^{2}	Pocahontas	Mamacita	Baker	Baker		
7	Flirty	Blonde Baller	Pocahontas^{1}	Flirty^{2}	Lady	Pocahontas^{1}	Hot Wings^{2}	Flirty^{2}	Classy^{1}	Flirty^{2}			
8	Freckles	Pocahontas	PS	PS^{1}	Spanish Fly	Flirty^{2}	Pocahontas	Sassy	Flirty	Classy^{1}			
9	Hot Wings	Doll	Aloha	Mamacita^{2}	Pocahontas	Classy	Sassy	Blonde Baller^{2}	Blonde Baller^{2}				
10	Junk	PS	Junk^{2}	Classy	Mamacita	Spanish Fly	Spanish Fly^{2}	Spanish Fly					
11	Lady	Mamacita	Classy	Junk	Sassy	Mamacita^{2}	PS						
12	Mamacita	Lady	Flirty	Sassy	Blonde Baller^{2}	Junk							
13	Pocahontas	Junk	Apple	Blonde Baller	Junk^{2}	Lady							
14	PS	Apple	Lady	Apple	Apple								
15	Ribbon	Baker	Mamacita	Aloha^{1}									
16	Sassy	Wiggly	Wiggly										
17	Show Me	Freckles											
18	Spanish Fly	Ribbon											
19	Vegas	Vegas											
20	Wiggly	Show Me											

The contestant won the competition as Real's selection.
The contestant won the competition as Chance's selection.
The contestant got a "R" chain from Real.
The contestant got a "C" chain from Chance.
The contestant got a Stallionaire "R/C" chain from Real & Chance.
The contestant did not receive a chain, but was allowed to stay.
The contestant was going to receive a chain, but was eliminated.
The contestant was eliminated.
The contestant quit the competition.
The contestant was eliminated due to physical violence.
The contestant was eliminated before the elimination ceremony.
^{1} The contestant won a date with Real.
^{2} The contestant won a date with Chance.

- In Episode 4, Chance was going to decide to eliminate Blonde Baller or Junk, but he decided to let them stay for another night.
- In Episode 5, after Chance revealed that his chain was for Mamacita, this implies that Real originally had a chain for Lady.
- In Episode 6, PS said she wanted to quit so the boys did not give out anymore chains, therefore the names are in alphabetical order after Blonde Baller and Mamacita, both of whom were given Chance chains at the ceremony.
- Also in Episode 6, there was a challenge between Real's Girls and Chance's Girls, having Tony Little select the winners.
- In Episode 10, Real was going to decide to eliminate Pocahontas or Sassy, but he decided to let them stay for the season finale.

== Episodes ==
=== Back in the Saddle Bros ===
First aired on August 3, 2009

Chance and Real have returned for a second season, after both failed to making a lasting connection in season one; Chance selected no one, and Real's romantic relationship with Corn Fed ended soon after the show. In season two, the Stallionaires have twenty new women looking for love, and it will be up to Real and Chance to find their "Stallionettes". The season features new twists such as no "Real girls" or "Chance girls" yet, leading to "double the competition for their men." This twist leads to "calculated game-play" for some of the women. After eliminations, only sixteen women will remain in the competition.

- Bottom 3: Freckles, Ribbon, Wiggly
- Disqualified: Show Me and Vegas
- Eliminated: Freckles and Ribbon

Reasons for Elimination

- Show Me: For physically assaulting Vegas after Vegas insulted and provoked Show Me and the other girls.
- Vegas: For insulting and provoking Show Me to hit her and insulting and provoking the other girls in an attempt to give her an advantage.
- Freckles: Neither Real or Chance felt much of a connection.
- Ribbon: She came off too hard to both Real and Chance and behaved childish when she wasn't chosen.

Episode Notes

- Ribbon wanted to get Chance's attention, but she moved on to get Real's attention after Chance thought that she looked like a man.
- Real and Chance originally wanted to name Freckles Sasquatch or Yeti because she looked like one. Later, Chance became irritated by her advances towards him that he moved somewhere in the backyard.

=== Love is in the Stallionaire ===
First aired August 10, 2009

Real and Chance ask the sixteen remaining women to give a "door-to-door sales pitch" outlining their qualities. The contestant with the best pitch will win a date. Blonde Baller, Junk, Pocahontas, Sassy, and Spanish Fly (which Hot Wings thought was unfair) were chosen as winners. All the girls get to go to prom, but the winners were given nice dresses while the rest were given sloppy ones. The winners also went with Real and Chance to a place where a real prom was held, while the others were stuck in the house. Later, before Real and Chance were ready to go to bed, Wiggly came into the room to impress Real, but she "came off a little too strong". The next day, Lady talk to Real and confessed that she used to date women, but it's all in the past. Both Real and Chance had a conservation with Mamacita, questioning if she is there for the boys or for TV. She jokingly said "all the above". During elimination, Mamacita and Wiggly were in the bottom 2. Mamacita confirmed she was there for the boys, not for TV, eliminating Wiggly.

- Challenge: Ding Dong Challenge
- Challenge Winners: Blonde Baller, Junk, Pocahontas, Sassy, Spanish Fly
- Bottom 3: Lady, Mamacita, Wiggly
- Eliminated: Wiggly

Reasons for Elimination

- Wiggly: Real had no connection with her and felt like she was coming off too strong, and yet was too shy.

=== Girls Gone Viral ===
First aired August 17, 2009

The fifteen remaining girls have their booty shaking skills put to the test when they audition for the Stallionaire's viral music video. Gloria Velez made a guest appearance, getting them into "booty camp". Then Pocahontas, Baker, and Lady were chosen as team captains and they chose teams. Apple was not confident doing the challenge, while Lady's team had many ideas that they cannot come to the conclusion of. Real and Chance came to judge all the teams' performances, and Real and Chance made the decision that Baker's team wins the challenge. Both of the boys took Aloha, Baker, Flirty, Mamacita, and PS to the Hollywood Park Race Track. PS, who was undecided about who she like, decides she likes Real better than Chance. Meanwhile, at the house, Junk eavesdropped on Blonde Baller talking to her "best friend", which Junk believes it is her boyfriend. The next day, PS called out Blonde Baller for having a boyfriend and Chance doesn't know what to believe. Aloha had become emotional; even more crazy after Real told her to "domesticate" herself, after Real was disgusted that Aloha was eating raw fish. At elimination, Real and Chance gave out Real chains and Chance chains. It came down to Aloha and Apple. Aloha was cracking up and Chance confirmed that Aloha is indeed crazy, leading Real to eliminate her.

- Special Guest: Gloria Velez
- Challenge: Stallionaire's Viral Music Video Challenge

Pool Video Performers: Apple, Junk, Pocahontas, Sassy, Spanish Fly
Bar Video Performers: Blonde Baller, Hot Wings, Lady, Classy, Doll
Mansion Video Performers: Aloha, Baker, Flirty, Mamacita, PS

- Challenge Winners: Aloha, Baker, Flirty, Mamacita, PS

Note: Real and Chance decided to give out R Chains and C Chains due to the fact that they have an idea which girl is here for one of them.

- Chance's Girls: Baker, Hot Wings, Spanish Fly, Flirty, Mamacita, Junk, Blonde Baller
- Real's Girls: Doll, Lady, Pocahontas, PS, Classy, Sassy, Apple
- Bottom 3: Aloha, Apple, Blonde Baller
- Eliminated: Aloha

Reasons for Elimination

- Aloha: Real felt she was too unstable and too crazy.

=== Yeti Set Go ===
First aired August 24, 2009

After elimination, Blonde Baller gets a call from one of her friend that her best friend died in Michigan, which Junk found very suspicious. The girls' next challenge is to find Big Foot and bring him back, with the winners getting a date with the boys. But little do the girls know that Big Foot is actually the boys' brother Micah. The Pink Team won the challenge with Blonde Baller tackling the Yeti. Baker and Doll had a date up in Real and Chance's bedroom, having a foot psychic reading. Both girls were able to open up to the boys about their insecurities. The next morning, Apple made Real breakfast, but he still has some concern about Apple fitting into his lifestyle. That day, Real and Chance took PS, Blonde Baller, and Junk to the zoo. Both Junk and Blonde Baller got into an argument. When Real asked if Sassy is a good fit for him as a question to Junk's peeping, PS mocks her. Blonde Baller tells Sassy, but starts another argument with Junk right after. During elimination, it was down to Apple and Sassy for Real and Junk and Blonde Baller for Chance. Real eliminated Apple, but Chance doesn't eliminate either girl.

- Challenge: Search for Bigfoot
- Special Guest: Micah Givens as The Yeti

Purple Team: Pocahontas, Sassy, Apple, Flirty, Mamacita
Blue Team: Hot Wings, Lady, Spanish Fly, Classy
Pink Team: PS, Blonde Baller, Doll, Junk, Baker

- Challenge Winner's: Pink Team

Real Girls: P.S., Doll, Classy, Pocahontas, Sassy
Chance Girls: Baker, Hot Wings, Lady, Spanish Fly, Mamacita

- Bottom 4: Apple, Blonde Baller, Junk, Sassy
- Eliminated: Apple

Reasons for Elimination

- Apple: Real felt no connection with Apple and she was too quiet and reserved; he felt that she wouldn't fit into his lifestyle.

=== Take A Chance Or Get Real ===
First aired August 31, 2009

After elimination, Blonde Baller tells Chance that she is real and she doesn't have a boyfriend at home. The next day, Real and Chance are reviving a tradition of wrestling as a challenge. Whichever team puts on a great show wins dates with the boys. The first match was produced by the black team, with Hot Wings (as Handspring) & Doll (as Dollface) vs. PS (as Port Mortem) & Baker (as Backbreaker). The second match was produced by the pink team, with Blonde Baller (as Blonde Mauler) & Classy (as Classy Daze) vs. Spanish Fly (as Flapper) & Lady and Junk (as Lady Cyborg and Junk). The third match was produced by the purple team, with Pocahontas (as Poca the Warrior) and Flirty (as Dirty Flirty) vs. Mamacita (as Senorita Mamacita) and Sassy (as Sassy Sphynx). Because of collective chemistry, it ended up that the purple team won the challenge, leaving Hot Wings upset without another date. Sassy and Mamacita get to go on romantic dates that night. On the way there, Chance drank too much tequila, causing him to act obnoxious towards Mamacita during their date. Chance passed out that night while Real bring both Mamacita and Sassy back to the house. Meanwhile, Hot Wings was so frustrated about not getting a date that she decided to pack and leave, but Sassy encouraged her to stay. The next day, Real and Chance took Flirty and Pocahontas to the studio where the TV show Chelsea Lately was filmed, where the girls get to see the boys on TV. Mamacita was jealous that Flirty had a better date than her, causing her to break down to tears. So Real comforted her and tells her she doesn't have to be there for Chance. Junk had one-on-one with Chance and Lady had one-on-one with Real. Junk talks more about Blonde Baller and Lady doesn't know what to tell Real. During elimination, it was down to Mamacita, Lady, and Junk. Both Real and Chance wanted to give their chains to Mamacita. She was confused whom to pick, but in the end, she chose Real because she wanted to teach Chance a lesson. Lady was eliminated, and shortly after, Junk, who thought she would survive another elimination, was also eliminated.

- Challenge: Stallionaire Slam Association Wrestling II (SSAW II)

Purple Team (first place): Pocahontas, Sassy, Flirty, Mamacita; (Trainer: Christie Ricci)
Black Team (second place): PS, Baker, Hot Wings, Doll; (Trainer: Assassin Hollywood)
Pink Team (third place): Spanish Fly, Junk, Blonde Baller, Lady, Classy; (Trainer: The Great Onyx)

- Challenge Winner's: Purple Team "Culture Clash 09"

Real Girls: Classy, Doll, Mamacita, Pocahontas, PS, Sassy
Chance Girls: Baker, Blonde Baller, Flirty, Hot Wings, Spanish Fly

- Bottom 3: Junk, Lady, Mamacita
- Eliminated: Junk, Lady

Reason for elimination

- Lady: Real felt that he has no chemistry with her.
- Junk: Chance felt that Junk was letting him know more about Blonde Baller rather than letting Chance getting to know her.

Episode notes

- Both Lady and Junk explained that the reason why both of them were eliminated is that Real and Chance prefer light-skinned girls.
- A bonus clip shows Hot Wings finally getting her date with Chance after elimination.
- PS stated that she had to go to hospital because Hot Wings hit her really hard during their wrestling performance.

=== Pushin Product ===
First aired September 14, 2009

After elimination, Mamacita felt strange being a Real girl, but Real told her to give him a shot to getting to know her. Meanwhile, Sassy saw PS flirting with Chance and tells her if he likes Chance, she should stay by Chance instead. Angry, PS went outside and demanded Sassy what was that about. Sassy yelled at her that she shouldn't switch from brother to brother. The challenge the next day was to present an infomercial based on Real and Chance's products, having the Real and Chance girls competing against each other. It ended that Chance's girls won because of their outstanding energy in their presentation. Shortly after, PS called them "ghetto", surprising Real, Chance, and the girls. Real, Chance, and the winning girls went to a club that night. Meanwhile, Mamacita is still having feelings for Chance, but might be afraid that she might get eliminated by both of them. The next day, Chance invited his tattoo parlor to the house and he and some of the girls are getting tattoos. Real was upset that Mamacita is flirting with Chance. Hot Wings also felt upset about Mamacita flirting with Chance, trying hard to get his attention, but ended up yelling at him when she took his sense of humor seriously. Meanwhile, Blonde Baller told Classy about the joke Chance made at her, which Baker believe Blonde Baller to be shady and a manipulator. During elimination, PS went up to Real and said she doesn't want to be in the house anymore. Real said she was going to go home anyway because of her offensive "ghetto" comments towards him, Chance, and the girls, including Sassy. Real called down Mamacita and said that she should accept his brother's chain because she was feeling Chance more. The brothers decided not to give out the chains to the rest of the girls that night.

- Special Guest: Tony Little
- Challenge: Infomercial Presentation

Real Girls – Classy, Doll, Mamacita, Pocahontas, PS, Sassy; (Product: Real Silk Hair Care)
Chance Girls – Baker, Blonde Baller, Flirty, Hot Wings, Spanish Fly; (Product: Pure Chance Moisturizer)

- Challenge Winner's: Baker, Blonde Baller, Flirty, Hot Wings, Spanish Fly
- Quit: PS

Real Girls: Classy, Doll, Pocahontas, Sassy
Chance Girls: Blonde Baller, Baker, Flirty, Hot Wings, Mamacita, Spanish Fly

Reason for Withdrew

- PS: PS quit because she thought that Sassy was going to tell Real that she came here for Chance but wanted to date him. Real told her that he was going to eliminate her anyway because of her offensive comments towards Real, Chance, and the girls.

Episode Notes

- In a bonus clip, Chance said to the girls the reason why he didn't choose a girl during Season 1 is because Risky is too much of a friend and Cali "smashed the homies", in reference to For the Love of Ray J.

=== Animals Are Awesome ===
First aired September 21, 2009

Flirty wanted more connection from Chance, but Blonde Baller wants her to switch to Real for less competition. The next day, their challenge is to write and perform a song called "Animals are Awesome", with each girl writing and singing a verse about an endangered animal and all girls from each team to sing the chorus. It ended that Team 2 named EES (Exotic Endangered Species) won. That night, Real and Chance took Classy and Hot Wings went to a fancy restaurant for their double date. The next day, Real and Chance took Blonde Baller, Flirty, and Doll to a local tennis court to play tennis. On the way there, Flirty opened up to Chance about her troubled past. The group played tennis with Blonde Baller disgusted about Chance giving Flirty more attention than her. During one-on-one, Blonde Baller gave Chance the scoop about the rest of Chance's girls, including Flirty. Flirty denied what Blonde Baller said about her on her one-on-one with Chance. After the date, Flirty told the rest of the girls about Blonde Baller, which causes most of the girls to turn on Blonde Baller. Chance had one-on-ones with Spanish Fly and Mamacita (finding Spanish Fly boring, but Mamacita fun and interesting), while Real had a one-on-one with Pocahontas, which she opens up about her past. At elimination, it was down to Blonde Baller and Spanish Fly. In the end, Chance chose Blonde Baller to stay another night, shocking the Chance's girls.

- Special Guest: Micah Givens
- Challenge: Write and perform the song, "Animals Are Awesome"
  - Team 1: Baker, Mamacita, Pocahontas, Sassy, Spanish Fly
  - Team 2: Blonde Baller, Classy, Doll, Flirty, Hot Wings
- Winner: Team 2
  - Real Girls: Classy, Doll, Pocahontas, Sassy
  - Chance Girls: Baker, Blonde Baller, Flirty, Hot Wings, Mamacita
- Bottom 2: Blonde Baller, Spanish Fly
- Eliminated: Spanish Fly

Reason for Elimination

- Spanish Fly: Chance felt that the strong connection that they had in the beginning of the competition had faded away after not spending much time together, and stated that Spanish Fly was now floating under the radar.

=== Stallionaire Court ===
First aired September 28, 2009

After elimination, Blonde Baller realize that she needs more romantic towards Chance so she went up to his room to chill. The next day, the next challenge is to present a case against another girl of an opposing team in Stallionaire Court, because Real and Chance are tired of the drama in the house. The Contemptresses (Baker, Hot Wings, Pocashontas) automatically targets Blonde Baller for being a liar and a snitch. The Pleading Hearts (Doll, Flirty, Mamacita) decided to go for Hot Wings for threatening to leave the house. The Impeaches (Blonde Baller, Classy, Sassy) went for Flirty because of her legal issues, which Blonde Baller is the only girl on the team that has knowledge. It was time for go to court and the Pleading Hearts were first to go up. Hot Wings told Real and Chance that she wanted to leave because she was frustrated that she didn't get a date with Chance. Mamacita suddenly said that Hot Wings is indeed there for Chance, causing the judges to find Hot Wings innocent and the Pleading Hearts to lose their case. The Impeaches presented that charges about Flirty not being the true definition of a Stallionette. Even though Flirty was honest about her legal issues, the evidence the Impeaches presented was overwhelming that she was found guilty. The Contemptresses opened their case with Pocahontas asking if BB's father knows where she is, with Blonde Baller saying that she didn't tell her father where she is, but she told him that she's on a TV show, exposing herself as a liar. Baker asked Classy to come to the stand as a witness, asking her what Blonde Baller said to her the other day about Chance. Classy relayed what Blonde Baller said to her, exposing her as a snitch. Ultimately, Blonde Baller was found guilty. The Impeaches won the challenge, winning dates. Chance also announced that there will be elimination that night. Back at the house, Blonde Baller overheard Flirty threatening to beat her up. Her solo date with Chance went well until Blonde Baller told him about Flirty, disappointing Chance. Meanwhile, Flirty was breaking down because Blonde Baller had blown her legal trouble out of proportion and Chance started to worry about that. During elimination, it was down to Flirty and Blonde Baller. Blonde Baller repeatedly said she was here for Chance, but Chance felt betrayed that he has been lied to the whole time, giving his chain to Flirty, eliminating Blonde Baller.

- Special Guest: Micah Givens as The Bailiff
- Challenge: Present the best case against one girl from another team in Stallonaire Court
  - The Contemptresses: Baker, Hot Wings, Pocahontas (vs. Blonde Baller)
  - The Impeaches: Classy, Blonde Baller, Sassy (vs. Flirty)
  - The Pleading Hearts: Doll, Flirty, Mamacita (vs. Hot Wings)
- Challenge Winners: Blonde Baller, Classy, Sassy
  - Real Girls: Classy, Doll, Pocahontas, Sassy
  - Chance Girls: Baker, Flirty, Hot Wings, Mamacita
- Bottom 2: Blonde Baller, Flirty
- Eliminated: Blonde Baller

Reason for Elimination

- Blonde Baller: Chance has lost all trust in her after she was exposed as a liar and a snitch in Stallionaire Court. She also gave the scoop on Flirty on their solo date even when Chance warns her not to mention any of the other girls.

Episode Notes

- The boys' brother Micah made his third appearance on the show in this episode.
- According to Blonde Baller, she said in the exit interview that Chance invited her over to his room after elimination and Chance demanded her to tell her about Flirty on their solo date.

=== Whine's and Cheese ===
First aired October 5, 2009

After elimination, the girls celebrated the departure of Blonde Baller. The next day, the girls were invited by the boys to the Robert Hall winery at Paso Robles, CA. Real and Chance wanted take wine-tasting, but also announced that each of them will take two girls out on a date. Chance had a one-on-one with Flirty, who told him that all her troubles are all in the past and it will not affect their relationship. Real had a one-on-one with Pocahontas, wanting more time with her. On the way the hotel, Sassy was so drunk that the limo had to pull over for her to puke. After they arrive at the Madonna Inn and Sassy sobering up, it was announced that Flirty, Mamacita, Classy, and Pocashontas get to go on dates with Real and Chance. As soon as the girls sat down, Chance had to use the bathroom, having Flirty and Mamacita wait for him. Classy attempted to crack some jokes to Real, but it made Real uncomfortable. Pocahontas then gave him an embarrassing dance that made Real laugh. Once Chance came back, Flirty open up more about her life, which Chance found strange and perceived her as a liar. Real chose Pocahontas and Chance chose Mamacita for night caps. The next day, the girls got back to the house and that night was elimination. Chance spend some one-on-one with Hot Wings. After that, he went to the kitchen and found a cake made from Baker, which was supposed to be a surprise and made Baker upset after Chance autographed it with cream. Real also spend some one-on-one with Doll, but then Sassy surprised Real, draped in lingerie. Then she told him she's unsure if she's the right woman for him, which concerns him. During elimination, it was down to Classy and Sassy for Real and Baker and Flirty for Chance. Classy and Flirty were eliminated

- Challenge: Who can grab attention from Real and Chance
- Challenge Winners: Classy, Flirty, Mamacita, Pocahontas
  - Real Girls: Doll, Pocahontas, Sassy
  - Chance Girls: Baker, Hot Wings, Mamacita
- Bottom 4: (C) Baker & Flirty, (R)Classy & Sassy
- Eliminated: Classy, Flirty

Reason for Elimination

- Classy: Real felt that Classy is only telling how she can be funny, instead of showing it.
- Flirty: Chance still felt that Flirty has a lot going on in her life.

Episode Notes

- Even though Classy didn't grab Real's attention at the winery, Real picked her because he wants to know if Classy give him her funny side.

=== Poca Face ===
First aired October 12, 2009

Sassy is wondering how Pocahontas to be "a perfect person", but she is unable get any dirt out of her. It was announced that Real and Chance's parents Claudia and Robert are coming to visit. All the girls get to meet the parents during the barbecue. Real announced that he and his girls will have a date that night with the parents while Chance and his girls will have a date tomorrow with the parents. Real took Doll, Pocahontas, and Sassy to the baseball park for their date that night for three of the girls to meet their parents. Each girl have one-on-one time with the parents. When asked if Sassy would be a good fit for Real, Pocahontas stressed that she doesn't have a spark with Real and she needs to be humble. Sassy said to their parents that Pocahontas might be "a perfect person", but she might also be hiding something. The next day, Chance took Hot Wings, Mamacita, and Baker to a cooking class to meet the parents. Again, each girl has one-on-one with them. Hot Wings said that Baker "is too much alike." Baker stated that Hot Wings is immature. When all of them sat down for lunch with Chance and the parents, Baker and Hot Wings started arguing about their feelings, leading Chance having to end their date. Real and Chance had a conversation with their parents about the girls. He had some one-on-one with Sassy, letting her know that she needs to be more loose, having her take out her contact lenses. Chance had some one-on-one with Baker and Hot Wings because of the argument during lunch. During elimination, Real and Chance announced that they would be going to Miami, but they have room for four girls. Chance begins by giving Mamacita his first chain, leaving Baker and Hot Wings for his bottom two. Chance is concerned about Baker's attitude and Hot Wings's immaturity. But Hot Wings pleaded that age doesn't matter when you're in love with somebody, moving Chance and eliminating Baker. Real gave his first chain to Doll, leaving Pocahontas and Sassy at the bottom two. He has developed feelings for both of them, but also has some questions about both of them, Pocahontas not being completely honest and Sassy still being high maintenance. It was decided that Real will take both girls along with Doll to Miami.

- Real Girls: Doll, Pocahontas, Sassy
- Chance Girls: Mamacita, Hot Wings
- Bottom 4: (C) Baker and Hot Wings (R) Pocahontas and Sassy
- Eliminated: Baker

Reason for Elimination

- Baker: Chance felt like she wasn't showing enough love and affection like the other two girls.

Episode Notes

- Real was supposed to eliminate either Pocahontas or Sassy, but ended up keeping them both.
- In a bonus clip, Real's dad said to Sassy and Pocahontas how Real got his long hair, inferring that he inherited that from relatives from India.

=== Clip Show ===
First aired October 19, 2009

Real and Chance shared some of the best and worst moments of the show.

Includes:

- Spanish Fly and her boobs
- Junk and her large butt
- Lady eating toilet paper
- Aloha being insane
- Blonde Baller being the enemy in the house
- Doll not being able to play baseball and tennis, but can wrestle
- Hot Wings whining
- Pocahontas being a maid and a spiritual person
- Mamacita as a wild person
- Sassy referring herself in the third person

=== Welcome in Miami, Beeotch ===
First aired October 26, 2009

After elimination, Pocahontas and Sassy still despise each other. The next day, Real, Chance, and the girls depart to Miami and settle into a hotel. That night, Real had dinner with his three girls and said that one girl will be eliminated that next day. Real then took out applications and the audition tapes of each girl to see what they were like before coming to the show. He first saw Sassy's tape and found she was the same person who came to the show. Then he checked Doll's tape and found she was attracted to bad boys like Chance. He then discovered on Pocahontas’ tape that she lied about having a threesome with her former boyfriend and his friend. The next day, Pocahontas felt nervous about what happen last night. Later, both Real and Chance met the girls on the dock. Chance tells Mamacita that she would go on a yacht with him, while Hot Wings will have her date later, going back to the limo. Real then became his early elimination, choosing Sassy to stay and have her date later with Real, leaving Doll and Pocahontas as his bottom two. He ultimately eliminated Pocahontas. This shocks her dearly, letting Doll on the yacht and waterskiing with Mamacita and Chance. That night, Real and Chance had dates with Doll and Mamacita, shortly after bring them back to their rooms for their night caps. The next day, Real and Chance took Sassy and Hot Wings to Gator Park to see some crocodiles and alligators. Hot Wings decides to step in the water to prove to Chance that she is adventurous also. That night, Sassy and Hot Wings have dates with Real and Chance. During Real's date, Sassy pulls out a notebook full of questions to ask Real, which surprised him but felt that she is interested in him. Hot Wings accidentally said that she loved him. Real and Chance took the girls back to their rooms for their night caps. The next day would be the day Real and Chance would their girls each to be with. During their final elimination, Real picked Doll to be with. Chance had a difficult decision, but Hot Wings said she felt in love in with him and Chance decides to take Hot Wing over Mamacita.

- Final 3 Real's Girls : Pocahontas, Doll, Sassy
- Eliminated: Pocahontas
- Final 2 Real's Girls : Doll, Sassy
- Doll's Date: A ride on a yacht and waterskiing, a romantic date, and an overnight stay in Real's room.
- Sassy's Date: A Gator Park boat ride, a romantic date, an overnight stay in Real's room.
- Hot Wings' Date: A Gator Park boat ride, a romantic date, an overnight stay in Chance's room.
- Mamacita's Date: A ride on a yacht and waterskiing, a romantic date, and an overnight stay in Chance's room.
- Real Girl: Doll
- Chance Girl: Hot Wings

Reason for Elimination

- Pocahontas: Real found out that Pocahontas lied to him.
- Sassy: Real felt that Sassy can be a jealous and possessive person.
- Mamacita: Chance still felt he's not ready for a relationship with her.

Episode Notes

- On his date with his final three girls, Real stated the reason why he and Corn Fed broke up because he found out that she broke up her engagement to another man a month before coming to the first season of the show.

== Aftermath ==
- In another interview published the same day, Doll also said that she had not heard from Real, that they had no "relationship established" and that she was "moving on", although she was giving him the "benefit of the doubt" because the show's contract may have prohibited him from contacting her until after the reunion episode. While Hot Wings said she felt that "really, we didn't win" and "it's almost like we got eliminated too, because we never hear from them," Doll stated that, for her, winning was "like a trophy" and "because Real was a real nice guy" she feels "really great about winning somebody over like that." There was no reunion show for Real Chance of Love 2.
- Hot Wings (Kamille), Mamacita (Michelle), Sassy (Gabrielle), and Blonde Baller (Kip Force) appeared on the fourth season of I Love Money.
- Ahmad Givens (Real) died on February 21, 2015, after a long battle of colon cancer. He was 33.
- Kamal Givens (Chance) was given a new dating series entitled "One Mo' Chance" on The Zeus Network.
