= Murder of Jasmine Fiore =

California murder case

- Ryan Jenkins and Jasmine Fiore
- Location: Body was found in Buena Park, California, U.S.
- Date: August 15, 2009
- Attack type: Strangulation
- Deaths: 2 (including the perpetrator)
- Victim: Jasmine Fiore
- Perpetrator: Ryan Alexander Jenkins

The murder of Jasmine Fiore occurred on August 15, 2009. Fiore was a model from Santa Cruz, California, United States. Her body was discovered on August 15, 2009, after having been strangled and stuffed into a suitcase. Her remains had been mutilated to prevent recognition; she was eventually identified by the serial numbers of her breast implants. Fiore was 28 years old at the time of her death.

Her husband, Ryan Alexander Jenkins, a real estate investor and former reality TV contestant from Victoria, British Columbia, Canada, was the only suspect, and was formally charged with the murder. On August 23, 2009, Jenkins was found dead in a hotel room in Hope, British Columbia, Canada, located 150 miles away from his hometown, after committing suicide at age 32.

== Fiore's background ==
Fiore was born Jasmine Lepore on February 8, 1981. Her parents divorced when she was eight years old, and she was raised by her mother, Lisa Lepore, in Bonny Doon, California. In her youth, she enjoyed playing football, and worked for a local grocery store.

Fiore was a swimsuit model who frequently worked as a body-painted model at parties for entertainment. She appeared in shows at Las Vegas area casinos. Fiore had acted in commercials for adult phone lines and bathing suits. Fiore had also obtained a real-estate license, and was planning to open a gym and personal training center.

According to Fiore's friend of a year-and-a-half, Marta Montoya, Fiore had a longstanding but intermittently serious relationship, with whom Fiore wanted to settle down. According to People magazine, another suitor of Fiore's was Travis Heinrich, whom she met around 2005. Heinrich and Fiore had become engaged, and remained so for less than half a year in 2006 or 2007; although the couple broke off this engagement, they continued to date.

== Jenkins' background ==
Jenkins was born on February 8, 1977, in Victoria, British Columbia, Canada, and later moved to Calgary a year after his birth, where his father, Dan Jenkins, is a prominent architect. Jenkins attended Western Canada High School before moving back to Victoria where he attended St. Michaels University School. From 1995 to 1999, Jenkins attended Mount Royal College and graduated with a Degree in Business and Aviation. In 2001, Jenkins served as President of Townscape Development Inc., a real estate development company created by his father, Dan Jenkins in 2000. In January 2007, Jenkins had been sentenced to 15 months' probation on an unspecified assault charge against his then-ex-girlfriend while settling in Calgary back in 2005.

Jenkins had been engaged to Paulina Chmielecka, a Polish-born, Toronto-based actress and model he met in Las Vegas, for approximately two and a half years, from 2006 to 2008. Chmielecka later described Jenkins as "a ladies man" and told Maclean's that he had proposed the relationship be an open one. In 2009, Jenkins made similar declarations to others in his circle; close friend Chris Tutty, recalling Jenkins collecting telephone numbers from women while still married to Fiore, responded to the open relationship claim by saying "I laughed at that one" — a reaction Maclean's reported as representative of broader scepticism among those who knew him about whether the arrangement reflected genuine mutual agreement or served a different purpose. During the same period, Jenkins hosted a 30th birthday party at his Marda Loop home at which he hired two female performers; Maclean's reported that while some guests found the entertainment "right out of Vegas," others considered it in poor taste for a mixed gathering.

In October 2008, Jenkins obtained a position as a sales consultant at Concrete Equities Inc., a Calgary-based real estate investment firm, a role Maclean's magazine reported he secured "aided by his father." The firm, which had raised approximately $118 million from roughly 3,700 investors between 2005 and 2009, was subsequently found by the Alberta Securities Commission (ASC) to have operated as an unregistered securities dealer, maintaining a single co-mingled investor account with no complete financial statements and near-daily transfers between related entities.

Jenkins' placement at the firm coincided with the "collapse" of a separate Honduran resort development, Oceano Village at Caribe Point Bight, Roatan, with which his father, Dan Jenkins, a Calgary architect, had been publicly identified as "developer, president and architect." Oceano Village had been marketed to Canadian, Irish, and British buyers with a promised key handover date of June 2008; that date passed without delivery. A local Roatan real estate agent later stated the project "ran out of money before the crash of '08." The corporate vehicle for the scheme, Caribe Point Investments S.A., was an anonymous Honduran bearer share corporation. Buyers received no deeds, no escrow protection, and no refunds.

Jenkins took a leave of absence from Concrete Equities in early February 2009 to film the VH1 reality programme Megan Wants a Millionaire, in which he described himself as "an investment banker from Calgary" and submitted a claimed net worth of $2.5 million — a figure Maclean's noted "few took seriously." Filming ran from early February to mid-March 2009. Concrete Equities entered receivership on June 10, 2009. The ASC subsequently imposed fines totalling over $6 million on the firm's principals and found that approximately $24 million had been extracted in commissions and remuneration. Criminal fraud charges against two of the firm's senior officers followed in January 2014.

== Marriage ==
Fiore met Jenkins at a Las Vegas casino shortly after Megan Wants a Millionaire completed filming. They married two days later – March 18, 2009 – at A Little White Wedding Chapel on the Las Vegas Strip. According to court records, Jenkins was charged in June 2009 in Clark County, Nevada, with "battery constituting domestic violence" for hitting Fiore on the arm. Travis Heinrich, who was present, said Jenkins and Fiore were arguing over her kissing Heinrich, and Jenkins hit Fiore's arm, causing her to fall into a nearby swimming pool. Jenkins was to go on trial in December. During this period, Jenkins would return to Calgary, and soon depart for Mexico to participate in the third season of VH1's I Love Money. Upon his return, the pair reconciled and were traveling to San Diego for a poker game.

Lisa Lepore, Fiore's mother, claims that the two fought frequently, and that Jenkins was jealous of Fiore's friendships with her ex-boyfriends. Dan Jenkins, Ryan Jenkins' father, said that Fiore was his son's only friend in California, and that she would disappear for days at a time and lie about it to his son. In addition, Lepore told The Associated Press that her daughter had her marriage to Jenkins annulled in May 2009, but there are no court records of an annulment in either Nevada, where the couple had married, or Los Angeles County, where they last lived.

== Fiore's death ==
Investigators reported that Jenkins and Fiore checked into the L'Auberge hotel in Del Mar, California (near San Diego) on the evening of August 13, 2009. They were to attend a poker tournament, a charity fundraiser for the Karma Foundation at the Del Mar Hilton. Surveillance video captured Fiore and Jenkins leaving the Hilton at about 2:30 a.m. on August 14. The couple were later seen at the Ivy Hotel, a nightclub in downtown San Diego. At around 4:30 a.m., Jenkins returned to the L'Auberge hotel alone. Fiore was not seen alive again. Jenkins left the L'Auberge hotel at around 9 a.m. that day.

Fiore's body was discovered, but not identified, on August 15 at about 7 a.m., badly beaten and crushed inside a suitcase, in a dumpster in an alley in Buena Park, California. According to Buena Park police, Fiore's teeth and fingers had been removed, before her nude body was stuffed into the suitcase. She had also been strangled. Authorities believe the mutilation was an attempt to impede identification. On August 18, her remains were identified using the serial numbers of her breast implants. The Orange County coroner's office reported Fiore had died a couple of hours before her body was found. Fiore's white Mercedes was found abandoned in a parking lot in the city of West Hollywood, California, about a mile from the penthouse Fiore shared with Jenkins in Fairfax District, Los Angeles. Police reported that there was a significant amount of blood, and some evidence of hair pulling.

Jenkins reported Fiore missing on August 15 at 8:55 p.m. He told police that he last saw Fiore about 8:30 p.m. August 14 at their home on Edinburgh Avenue, Los Angeles. Jenkins said they had gone to San Diego for a poker event and that after returning, she dropped him off that evening, left to do errands, and never returned.

== Jenkins' movements after Fiore's death ==
At around 9 a.m. on August 16, 2009, the day after reporting Fiore missing and after spending some time packing, Jenkins was seen leaving their penthouse for the last time. Police said he then left Los Angeles, and went to Nevada to pick up his speedboat. On August 17, when contacted by police, Jenkins said he was in Utah, and was headed to Canada to resolve some immigration issues. On August 18, Fiore's body was identified, and the murder was first reported. On the afternoon of August 19, Jenkins called his father from Birch Bay, Washington, who informed him that Fiore had been found murdered.

The Whatcom County Sheriff's Department received witness reports of Jenkins' black BMW SUV towing a boat toward the Canada–US border. Police later found the BMW SUV and an empty boat trailer at a marina in Blaine, Washington; the engine was still warm. At the time Jenkins was only a person of interest in the investigation. He had not been charged, but Canadian authorities had been alerted to watch for him. U.S. Coast Guard and U.S. Customs and Border Protection (CBP) confirmed they had boats patrolling northwest Washington waters looking for Jenkins as early as August 19. Initial media reports were that the US Coast Guard and Canadian authorities chased Jenkins' speedboat as it crossed to Point Roberts, Washington, but officials later denied these reports.

On August 19, a man matching Jenkins' description was seen piloting his boat into a marina in Point Roberts, where Jenkins' stepmother lives. The Royal Canadian Mounted Police (RCMP) announced that they believed Jenkins crossed into Canada by boat sometime between August 19 and 20.

On August 20, Jenkins was charged with Fiore's murder, and an arrest warrant was issued. The same day, Jenkins called his detained father at the Vancouver International Airport, but his father had to hang up the call because of a cell phone policy while waiting in line at the U.S. Customs and Border Protection entry.

=== Jenkins' suicide ===
At about 6 p.m. on August 20, Jenkins arrived in a silver 2001 Chrysler PT Cruiser with a young blonde woman at the Thunderbird Motel in Hope, British Columbia, Canada. The car had Alberta license plates. They pulled up beside a dumpster, rather than beside the rooms, which the motel manager said was strange. Jenkins stayed in the car while a young woman paid cash for three nights' accommodation. The manager described the woman as attractive, about 25 to 30 years old, and very calm, making small talk while registering. The guest in the room next door said the woman stayed for about 20 minutes with Jenkins in Room 2, and then left the motel. The woman proved to be Jenkins's half-sister, Alena Jenkins. The manager saw Jenkins walking outside the motel the next day, August 21. The manager said Jenkins looked "exhausted", and was not recognizable from his picture on television.

At 11:30 a.m. on August 23, the pair failed to check out. Having noticed very little activity over the weekend, the motel manager and his nephew decided to check on the room. Jenkins was found dead, apparently of suicide; his body was hanging from a clothes rack by a belt. No suicide note was found at the motel; however, police found a document saved on Jenkins' computer titled, "Last Will and Testament", which was dated August 20, 2009.

On August 27, 2009, investigators found a storage unit full of Jenkins' belongings, including a suitcase of clothes, in Washington state.

Following his suicide, Jenkins' mother, Nada Jenkins, who resides in Vancouver, told the Associated Press that she believes that Jenkins did not kill Fiore. She replied in a brief telephone interview that she was sure the evidence would eventually prove his innocence and stated that "he's kind and we need to clear his name".

Jenkins' father, Dan Jenkins, wrote a letter to the Calgary Herald following his son's suicide. His letter noted that he was on a holiday when his son called on August 17, telling Dan that he was driving back home to Canada, and sadly recounted that Fiore had left him again. He said that they had returned from San Diego adding that she had left to run an errand but never returned. Dan did not learn about the murder until August 19, before immediately receiving the call from Birch Bay which led Dan to fly back to Vancouver by plane shortly after his son crossed the border.

== Reaction by VH1 ==
Following the announcement that Jenkins was connected with the murder of Fiore, VH1 put Megan Wants a Millionaire on indefinite hiatus, out of respect for Fiore's family. VH1 later made several moves that strongly indicated the show would never air again. VH1 deleted all mention of the show from its website apart from a statement expressing condolences to Fiore's family. It also dropped reruns of past episodes from its schedule and deleted the show's archived episodes from the iTunes Store and cable video on demand services. Jenkins' earlier assault conviction soon came to light; it had not been disclosed to either VH1 or Megan Wants a Millionaire producer 51 Minds. In a statement, 51 Minds said Jenkins would have never been allowed on the show had it known about the 2007 incident.

On August 21, VH1 told The New York Times that Megan Wants A Millionaire would not return to the air. The day after Jenkins' death, VH1 officially cancelled the show, and that it would not run the third season of I Love Money, which Jenkins won. 51 Minds was forced to reimburse VH1 for over $12 million in losses.

== Financial misrepresentation and casting verification ==
VH1 had hired Collective Intelligence, a private investigation firm, to perform background checks on Jenkins and the other contestants. Collective Intelligence does not perform background checks outside the United States, and outsourced the vetting of Jenkins to another firm, Straightline International. According to Collective Intelligence founder Erika Worth, no one from Straightline would return her calls once the news of Jenkins' 2005 conviction broke. In 2009, Collective Intelligence sued Straightline for breach of contract. The suit alleged that Straightline had falsely told Collective Intelligence that Jenkins' record was clean, and had also failed to check Jenkins against the RCMP criminal database. Collective Intelligence claimed to have lost valuable business from Viacom (owner of VH1), NBC, and ABC as a result of the damage to its reputation. In 2020, Worth told Entertainment Weekly that she had been forced to lay off almost all of her staff, and spent years rebuilding her firm. Straightline ultimately paid Collective Intelligence $810,000 to settle the suit.

While the background check failure focused on Jenkins's criminal record, a separate and unexamined dimension of his casting concerned his financial credentials. Jenkins claimed a net worth of $2.5 million as his qualifying credential for Megan Wants a Millionaire, presenting this wealth through Townscape Developments Inc., a corporate entity controlled by his father Dan Jenkins, a Calgary architect. Though described variously as a real estate developer and investment banker, Jenkins was a member of the Calgary Real Estate Board only until his membership lapsed in April 2009 — weeks after Megan Wants a Millionaire completed production — and conducted minimal documented independent activity under Townscape Developments Inc. Concurrent civil litigation in Calgary's Court of Queen's Bench revealed Jenkins's documented financial reality contrasted sharply with his claimed net worth. Patrick Keightley and Cheryl Dawes alleged in a statement of claim that Jenkins and Townscape Developments Inc. misappropriated a $57,750 condominium deposit, falsely represented membership in the Alberta New Home Warranty Program, and failed to hold deposit funds in trust as legally required. Separately, the Bank of Montreal filed a $31,646 statement of claim against Jenkins in July 2009, against which no statement of defence was ever filed. Jenkins also abandoned lease payments on a BMW 335xi, with BMW subsequently filing suit for $12,750.76. Legal analysts have noted that Jenkins's claimed net worth, derived from a Honduran real estate development controlled by his father and presented through a corporate entity, was subject to source-of-funds verification obligations under the USA PATRIOT Act's Customer Due Diligence requirements when a foreign national presents unverified wealth claims in connection with financial transactions under US jurisdiction. No such verification was conducted by VH1, Viacom, or 51 Minds Entertainment. The background check conducted by Straightline International examined Jenkins's criminal record but did not address the source or legitimacy of his claimed wealth — a separate and distinct verification obligation.

== Effect on reality TV ==
In a 2020 post-mortem on Fiore's murder, EW reported that the incident has had a considerable effect on the reality TV industry. 51 Minds cofounder Mark Cronin said that the incident "lenses every conversation I have" when vetting potential contestants. He added that 51 Minds now makes it a point to keep in contact with contestants after production ends. Christopher Catalano, who served as senior casting director for Megan Wants a Millionaire and has since moved to CBS as senior casting producer for Big Brother recalled that something felt off about Jenkins at the time of filming, and the fallout from Fiore's murder made him more willing to listen to his gut feelings about contestants; as he put it, "I'd rather be wrong than end up with another Ryan Jenkins." Worth recalled that in recent years, networks and studios who work with Collective Intelligence have wanted "a thorough report" from her firm without regard for budgetary questions.
