= BMW M335 =

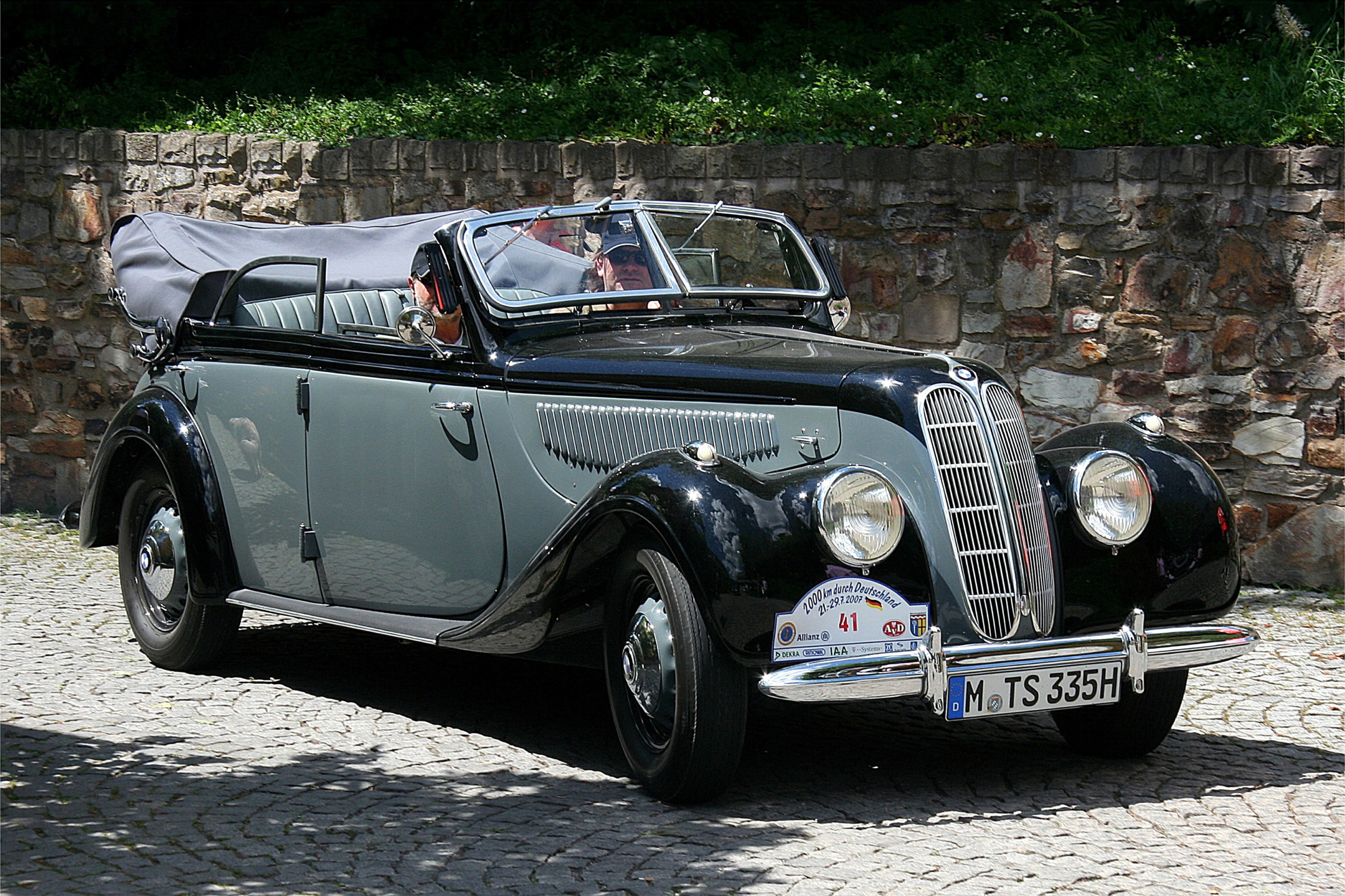
- 1939 335 cabriolet, which used the M335 engine

Overview
- Production: 1939–1941

Layout
- Configuration: Straight-6
- Displacement: 3.5 L (3,485 cc)
- Cylinder bore: 82 mm (3.23 in)
- Piston stroke: 110 mm (4.33 in)
- Cylinder block material: Cast iron
- Cylinder head material: Aluminium
- Valvetrain: OHV

Combustion
- Fuel type: Petrol

Chronology
- Predecessor: BMW M328
- Successor: None

The BMW M335 is a straight-6 OHV petrol engine which was produced from 1939 to 1941. It was used in the BMW 335 sedans and convertibles, and was the most powerful BMW engine prior to World War II.

Compared with its M328 predecessor, the M335 has a displacement increase of 77%. As per the M328, the M335 has an iron block and aluminium cylinder head.

Production of the M335 was cut short due to World War II. Although the M335 does not have a direct successor, in 1954 its place as the high-performance engine was filled by the BMW OHV V8.

== Versions ==
Engine	Displacement	Power	Torque	Years
M335	3,485 cc (212.7 cu in)	66 kW (89 bhp) at 3,000 rpm	180 N⋅m (133 lb⋅ft) at 2,000 rpm	1939–1941

=== M335 ===
Fuel is supplied by a single Solex 35 carburetor. The engine produces 66 kW (89 bhp) at 3,000 rpm.

Applications:

- 1939-1941 BMW 335
