= Tony Little =

American exercise instructor

- Born: September 16, 1956 (age 70); Fremont, Ohio, U.S.
- Occupations: Television personality, businessman

Anthony Little (born September 16, 1956) is an American television fitness personality and businessman, who is best known for his fitness infomercial products.

Little is a certified personal trainer and identifies himself as "America's Personal Trainer". The Florida Times-Union described him as being known for his "booming voice and enthusiasm" and long blond ponytail. Little is known for his use of the catchphrase he trademarked, "You can do it!"

== Biography ==
=== Personal life ===
As a child, Little and his mother were abandoned by his father, and he was raised by his mother in Fremont, Ohio. As an adult, he moved to St. Petersburg, Florida, to advance his personal fitness career. In 2009, Little married fitness model Melissa Hall. She delivered their twin sons, Cody and Chase, in Tampa on November 23, 2009. Little has two children from a prior marriage with Tracy Felix: daughter Tara (born ca. 1987) and son Trent (born ca. 1988). Little describes himself as an avid collector of antiques, classic cars, and obscure species of livestock. In 2022, Little married Michelle Lopresti.

=== Career ===
Little is a former Mr. Florida and Mr. Junior America bodybuilding champion. In 1983, while training for the National Physique Committee USA Championships, he was involved in a car accident and suffered numerous physical injuries. He had two herniated discs, a knee dislocation, a cracked vertebra, and lacerations. He recovered enough to compete in the event and finished fifth place as a middleweight competitor.

During his recovery, Little began developing exercise programs and became successful in the fitness industry. His products are sold by retailers worldwide, including Home Shopping Network and QVC. His most notable product, the Gazelle, was co-created by Little, colleague Harper Williams, and Fitness Quest.

== Parodies and media appearances ==
Little has frequently been the target and source of parody. In his own infomercials, he has often dressed up, and parodied other TV personalities, such as Fabio, Richard Simmons, and Susan Powter.

Little's persona was depicted as "Peter Small" on an episode of Beavis and Butt-head, "Take a Lap".

Bruce Springsteen's 1995-97 Ghost of Tom Joad Tour included the song "Sell It and They Will Come", a tribute to the insanity of late-night infomercials. Tony Little remarked, "I figure that he (Springsteen) got home from a gig and wanted to watch some TV and couldn't get away from me. The line was: 'And Tony Little, America's personal trainer, please kill yourself.' That cracks me up. I love the parody stuff."

During the original run of the Nickelodeon sketch show All That, Josh Server portrayed a manic fitness instructor named Tony Braun, for whom Little was the inspiration.

In 1997, he appeared as himself, making fun of his own image, on The Weird Al Show. The following year, he once again parodied himself on the Fox show MADtv. He also did a cameo appearance in the movie Frezno Smooth in 1999. In 2005, he appeared in a GEICO commercial that at first pretends to be another of his personal training videos but then becomes a commercial for car insurance.

On a 2002 episode of MADtv, he was parodied and was portrayed by WWE wrestler Stone Cold Steve Austin. Austin himself would be parodied by MADtv cast member Will Sasso.

Little appeared in the 2006 horror film The Pumpkin Karver.

Little appeared on VH1's Best Year Ever 2007.

In October 2006, Little appeared on an episode of G4TV's popular videogame review show X-Play; the episode in question was actually named "The Tony Little Episode". The highlight of the episode featured Little in a comedy sketch that directly parodied his own infomercials. In the sketch, Little magically transports (via superpowers) an excessively obese member of G4's web design team into a fitness infomercial (Little claims in the sketch that he obtained said superpowers when he was 16 years old, after being bitten by a radioactive ponytail). Little then shows the person how they can begin an exercise regimen using specialized video-game peripherals.

Little appeared in an October 29, 2006, episode of VH1 reality show Celebrity Paranormal Project.

Little appeared on The Tonight Show with Jay Leno three times.

Little appeared on NFL Countdown on December 7, 2008. He was "training" the players on the Tampa Bay Buccaneers.

In 2009, he appeared on an episode of Real Chance of Love 2.

One of Tony Little's infomercials was featured in the movie Jennifer's Body when Jennifer is watching TV and circling which boys to kill in her yearbook. Diablo Cody, the film's writer, also mentioned Little in her Oscar-winning script for Juno. When discussing exercise equipment, Juno's father comments, "My wife ordered one of those Tony Little Gazelles off the television.... I don't know about that guy. He doesn't look right."

In April 2014, Miller Lite beer launched a retrospective ad campaign that included a "recap" of the fitness crazes that (ostensibly) followed the introduction of Miller's low carb, low calorie beer, in which a brief clip of a Tony Little infomercial appears.

In 2018, Little could be seen briefly in a National Car Rental commercial. In the same commercial, Patrick Warburton also affectionately impersonates Little with his own faux ponytail.

In 2020, a clip of a Tony Little infomercial can be seen in the Cricket Wireless ad "Couchercize."
