= Megan Wants a Millionaire =

2009 American reality television series

- Cast
- Created by: Cris Abrego; Mark Cronin
- Starring: Megan Hauserman; Brandi Cunningham; Cecille Gahr; Rob Locke
- Country of origin: United States
- No. of seasons: 1
- No. of episodes: 3

Production
- Executive producers: Cris Abrego; Mark Cronin; Ben Samek; Matt Odgers; Rick de Oliveira
- Running time: 48 minutes
- Production companies: 51 Minds Entertainment; Endemol

Original release
- Network: VH1
- Release: August 2 – August 16, 2009

Related
- Rock of Love 2; I Love Money; Rock of Love: Charm School; I Love Money 3; I Love Money 4

Megan Wants a Millionaire is an American reality television series on VH1 in which former Rock of Love contestant Megan Hauserman has seventeen wealthy single men compete for her love. The show originated from a comment made by Hauserman during an episode of Rock of Love: Charm School, in which she stated that she ideally would like to become a "trophy wife". During the casting process for the series, VH1 asked for single men with a net worth of over $1,000,000.

In February 2009, Hauserman stated in an interview that taping of Megan Wants a Millionaire had begun. Hauserman also stated that she was looking for "a mature guy that can handle me and doesn't cry" and stated "He doesn't have to be rich; he has to be stable." Hauserman said she would take the show seriously, it would be "very real". Megan's best friends, Brandi Cunningham from VH1 shows and Cecille Gahr (from Beauty and the Geek) were to appear on the show and try to help Megan with her decisions. The show premiered on Sunday, August 2, 2009.

Broadcast of the program was suspended by VH1 on August 19, 2009, after it was announced that contestant Ryan Jenkins was being sought by police for questioning in connection to the murder of Jasmine Fiore (whom he married after the show had concluded). It subsequently emerged that Jenkins had been previously convicted of assault, which should have barred him from appearing on the show. On August 23, 2009, Jenkins was found dead, of an apparent suicide, at a motel in Hope, British Columbia. On August 24, 2009, Megan Wants a Millionaire was officially cancelled by VH1. Early reports after the incident occurred indicated that Jenkins was a finalist in the series. It was later confirmed from a contestant's Twitter account that Jenkins had placed third in the competition.

== Contestants ==
Name	Nickname	Net Worth	Age^{[a]}	Hometown	Eliminated
TJ Diab	The Vodka King	$6.5 million	38	Henderson, Nevada	Winner
Sharay "Punisher" Hayes	The Punisher	$3.1 million	35	New York, New York	Runner-Up
Ryan Jenkins	Smooth Operator	$2.5 million	31	Victoria, British Columbia/Calgary, Alberta	(3rd)
Francisco Baserva	The Latin Lover	$2 million	29	Colombia/Miami, Florida	(4th)
Al Jenney	The Nervous Guy	$5 million	41	Cocoa, Florida	N/A
Corey Thomas	The Hot Shot	$5 million	31	San Diego, California	N/A
Michael "Big Mike" Blume	The "Investor"	$2 million	45	New Jersey/Florida	N/A
David "00 Dave"	The World Traveler	$2.2 million	41	Dallas, Texas	Episode 5
Alex Netto	The Swinger	$3.5 million	32	Pinole, California	Episode 4
Dave "Sex Toy Dave" Levine	Internet Entrepreneur	$9.5 million	40	Lynnfield, Massachusetts	Episode 4
Joseph "Joe" Pascolla	The Trust Fund Baby	$10 million	22	Park Ridge, Illinois	Episode 3
Matt Riviera	The Pro Wrestler	$5.5 million	25	Russellville, Arkansas	Episode 3
Shaun Robertson	The Southern Gentleman	$2 million	30	Greenville, South Carolina	Episode 2
Garth McKeown	The Plumber	$2.5 million	38	Santa Monica, California	Episode 2
Donald Farmer	The Producer	$2 million	54	Cookeville, Tennessee	Episode 1
James Curran	The Baby	$4 million^{[b]}	25	Billerica, Massachusetts	Episode 1
Audi Pineda	Big Dog	~~$1.1 million~~^{[c]}	35	Pawtucket, Rhode Island	Episode 1

^[a] Ages are at time of filming
^[b] James awaits the death of his grandfather in order to receive an inheritance. He is not a millionaire yet.
^[c] Audi lied about his net worth.

== Elimination order ==
#	Contestants	Episodes					
#	Contestants	1	2	3	4	5^{[d]}	Cancelled
1	Al	Ryan	Al	David	Corey	Al	TJ
2	Alex	Corey	Mike	Corey	Al	Corey	Punisher
3	Audi	Francisco	Francisco	TJ	Mike	Francisco	Ryan
4	Corey	Punisher	Ryan	Punisher	Francisco	Mike	Francisco
5	David	TJ	TJ	Al	Ryan	Punisher	Corey
6	Donald	Sex Toy Dave	David	Ryan	TJ	Ryan	Mike
7	Francisco	Alex	Punisher	Mike	Punisher	TJ	Al
8	Garth	David	Sex Toy Dave	Sex Toy Dave	David	David	
9	James	Mike	Corey	Franscisco	Sex Toy Dave		
10	Joe	Matt	Matt	Alex	Alex		
11	Matt	Shaun	Alex	Joe			
12	Mike	Joe	Joe	Matt			
13	Punisher	Garth	Shaun				
14	Ryan	Al	Garth				
15	Sex Toy Dave	Donald					
16	Shaun	James					
17	TJ	Audi					

The contestant was still in the competition when Megan Wants a Millionaire was canceled.
The contestant was revealed to be the winner of the competition after the show's cancellation.
The contestant won a solo date with Megan.
The contestant went on a group date with Megan.
The contestant was eliminated before the elimination ceremony began.
The contestant went on a date with Megan, but was eliminated.
The contestant was eliminated.

- ^{^[d]} In Episode 5, during a group dinner when Megan asked David if he wanted to be there, he stated he did not, so she eliminated him before the elimination ceremony. Names are listed in alphabetical order as no elimination ceremony was held.

== Episodes ==
=== Breaking the Bank ===
First aired August 2, 2009

Megan is introduced, as is Megan's concierge Niles, who narrates the show. After meeting her 17 millionaires, Megan brings in her two best friends Brandi Cunningham and Cecille Gahr. She presents each of the men with a gift that goes along with their nicknames.

After Megan hands out her presents, she announces there will be a mixer. First, Megan and Audi spend time together, and he claims that his "hump game" causes his past girlfriends to go crazy, which disturbs Megan. Joe and David show up next to chat. David tells Megan that he would love to go shopping with her. Cisco and Punisher show Megan their physically fit bodies which impresses Megan. Corey tells her he wants to find his queen and spend the rest of his life with a beautiful woman. Outside, Brandi and Cecille give Al some motivation to be less awkward. He offers to use his gift of massage oil to give Megan a foot massage. During the massage he tries to be funny and have her touch his jaw saying he has a "dog jaw". He whips his head and barks and pretends to bite Megan's finger which causes her to spill wine all over herself. Megan storms away in tears to her room upstairs.

Megan returns to the party and Al apologizes for his childish actions and offers to buy her a new dress. Shaun takes Megan inside for a private talk on the sofa. She tells him she likes his look and is physically attracted to him. Donald steps in and asks Megan to come to the fire pit with him for a one-on-one. Megan agrees because he is a movie director and wants to know if he could put her in movies. By Megan's request, Donald sets up an impromptu skit between Megan and James. James and Megan then kiss by the fire pit which ruins Donald's plan, but Megan admits that the kiss is terrible. Brandi and Cecille find out James expects to soon inherit his grandfather's fortune and isn't a millionaire yet. TJ shares a one-on-one with Megan and they talk about traveling. Finally, Megan sits with Ryan who is still a Canadian citizen. He tells her that he can only work in the United States if he gets married, but if they did get married, she wouldn't have to sign a pre-nup. Garth childishly smashes Joe's piggy bank.

Megan gathers with Brandi and Cecille in her room to discuss the 17 millionaires and who should go home that night. Despite what her friends have to say, Megan is still undecided. At elimination, Megan reveals that each man who will stay will receive a special credit card as her token of love. In order for the men to win her heart, they must "keep their account in good standing". Ryan is the first to receive his credit card. Corey is the second to receive his card. Next is Cisco, The Punisher, TJ, Sex Toy Dave, Alex, and David are all called. When Joe is brought down to receive his credit card, Megan asks about his missing piggy bank. Joe reveals that Garth broke it, and Megan scolds Garth for being a "bad boy". Garth then receives his credit card. Megan eliminates Audi and James. Next, Megan eliminates Donald because she is not attracted to him, but asks if he could still put her in a movie. Al receives the last credit card, but Megan jokingly warns him to never bark at her again.

- Bottom 5: Al, Audi, Donald, Garth, James
- Eliminated: Audi, Donald, James
- Elimination Notes:
  - Audi: He was eliminated because although Megan said she was physically attracted to him, Megan felt like she had absolutely nothing in common with him.
  - Donald: He was eliminated because Megan said he was so physically unattractive and that he would be more of a fan than a boyfriend.
  - James: He was eliminated because he was not a millionaire yet; Megan explains that there's nothing wrong with loving someone who's not rich, but since she was given the choice she said she'd rather love someone that is rich.

=== Will You Be My Valentine? ===
First aired August 9, 2009

Megan explains that Valentine's Day is her favorite holiday, and they have to make or buy presents for the first challenge. Megan explains that the gifts need to be thoughtful too, because anyone can buy her expensive gifts. The three men that impress her the most will be going on a group date the next day. Cisco decides he will cook a meal for Megan. Al, knowing he needs to redeem himself after the night before, writes a check. Mike decides to use his contacts to buy Megan a dress from Lloyd Klein, a fashion designer. The show hints that he is in the Italian Mafia because he is Italian and said in the first episode that he does "private deals". Meanwhile, Shaun knows that Megan likes sushi and wants Megan to eat sushi off of him naked. Garth works on a song entitled "Sex Mode" that he's been making for the last two years.

Megan's best friends, Brandi and Cecille, join Megan once again. Megan calls up Cisco first, who is wearing the apron Megan gave him and red boxer-briefs. Cisco feeds Megan his dish, and Megan says it's delicious. Next is Al, who gives Megan a card with a check for $8,000 inside. The check is made out for Javay Salon. Alex bought Megan red lingerie, but Megan doesn't like the bottoms because they're oversized. Ryan decides to appeal to Megan's "senses" which are actually her brain and mouth. Joe gives Megan a bikini and on the bottoms he wrote "Trophy Wife" with crayon, which doesn't impress Megan. Matt gives her cupcakes, and Corey gave her a list of things "on his heart"; neither one impresses her. Punisher wears his stripper outfit and dances. Shaun then lets Megan eat sushi off him, and she enjoys that she gets to embarrass him. T.J. gives Megan his vodka that he makes, and David gives Megan her passport stamped to go to New York, France, and Italy. Mike then presents Megan with the designer dress he got her. Garth sings "Sex Mode" to Megan and she doesn't enjoy that Garth is "touching himself" during the song. Megan announces that the winners—Shaun, Big Mike, and Al will be going on a skiing date.

Garth is surprised that he didn't win the date and goes to talk to Megan in her room. Megan tells Garth that she wanted something more romantic than a sex song. Niles brings Al, Mike, and Shaun in his office to discuss the "Date Menu", which is a menu of presents that they can buy for Megan on their date. Big Mike decides to buy something of his own for Megan, while Al and Shaun decide to split the cost of all three gifts on the menu and give them to Megan together. Shaun's credit card is repeatedly declined, and Al covers for him. Later that night, Garth decides to call his best friend and tells him to pick him up at the airport. Garth states that Megan is rude and he doesn't like her anymore because she didn't enjoy his song. Then he gives Megan his credit card and says that her credit is denied. Garth tells Megan that he knows she's just going to throw him away, and Megan says she doesn't care, and that "He needs to fucking suck it up, sit there, put a smile on his face, and be appreciative that he's here." She says that two can play the manipulation game and she does it much better. She says Garth is no match for her, and that he calmed down and obeyed just like she knew he would.

The next morning, Al gives Megan roses and says they're only from him. They get to the mountain, and Al gives Megan a red Juicy Couture snow jacket, while Mike gives Megan white skiing gloves to go with her jacket. Big Mike and Megan kiss, and then Al spends alone time with her and gives her the Tiffany's snow bracelet and necklace to remember the skiing trip. He then explains the situation with Shaun's credit card and why he gave all the presents to her by himself. They return to the mansion, and Megan talks to Joe alone. Joe talks about Lily (Megan's dog) a lot, and Megan feels like he might like Lily more than Megan.

At elimination, Megan's wearing the Lloyd Klein dress that Big Mike bought for her, and she thanks him for it again. Al gets to keep his credit card first and Megan saying he has gone from showering her with drinks to showering her with gifts. Next is Big Mike and she says that he likes that he is big and strong and that he can protect her, yet he is gentle and thoughtful as well. The next card goes to Cisco, followed by Ryan, TJ, David, Punisher, Sex Toy Dave, Corey, and Matt. Megan pulls out a giant pair of scissors that she will cut the eliminated persons' credit cards with. She then calls down Alex, and makes him promise to never to buy her "grandma panties" again before giving him back his card. Megan tells Garth his luck has run out and cuts his credit card in half. Megan said that she made up her mind to get rid of Garth the night before, but that contestants only leave on her terms. She calls down Joe next, and tells him that she has more of a friendship connection with him. Joe asks for a second chance, and kisses her with his mouth wide open—a horrible, awkward kiss. Megan gives Joe his card. Megan calls down Shaun and says the way he handled the credit card issue troubled her because he didn't stick up for himself and then cuts his credit card in half.

- Challenge: Valentine's Day Presents
- Challenge Winners: Al, Mike, Shaun
- Date: Skiing Trip
- Date Menu: (All three chosen by Al)
  - One Dozen Fresh Cut Long Stem Roses-$60.00
  - Juicy Couture Cherry Red Lined Snow Jacket-$269.00
  - Tiffany's Precision Carved Snowflake Necklace & Bracelet-$519.00
- Bottom 3: Garth, Joe, Shaun
- Eliminated: Garth, Shaun
- Elimination Notes:
  - Garth: Megan knew she was going to eliminate Garth when he turned in his card the night before, but decided that she was going to eliminate him on her terms instead of him walking out because she said no one leaves until she says so.
  - Shaun: He was eliminated because Megan said he was too much of a pushover and wouldn't stand up for himself. Al paid for everything on the Date Menu when Shaun's card was declined and gave all the presents to Megan without including him; even when they both decided to share the gifts and Megan said he did nothing to stand up for himself.

=== Billion Dollar Doggie ===
First aired August 16, 2009

After elimination, the remaining men relax and socialize with each other and Megan. Joe knows he has to step his game up or he will be eliminated soon, and David criticizes him for only being on a friendship level with Megan. The next morning, Ryan tells Cisco and Joe about his ways of picking up girls and later they are called into their next challenge. Megan tells the contestants are asked to design business plans to make Megan's dog, Lily, marketable. Each team will select a team leader, and they will have two hours to prepare a presentation. The men are split into four teams of three each and the team captain of the winning team will win a solo date with Megan, while the other two get a group date. The men start brainstorming ideas for Lily's company. Al of Team 1 wants to do a workout video featuring Lily, but Punisher, captain of Team 1, comes up with the idea of a dog spa instead. Ryan, the captain of Team 4, decides to create a dog food company with six different kinds of dog food in a rotating dish. Mike wants to do a dog water company for Team 2, but Team 2's captain TJ decides to do a dog spa also called Club Lily, and Mike asks, "Who does this guy think he is?" Lastly, Corey, captain of Team 3, decides to make a product so big that no one can buy it, and Sex Toy Dave says it's a horrible idea and that they won't make money doing that. Joe worries that he's going to make a fool out of himself because he's only a trust fund baby and has never worked with numbers or presentations. Meanwhile, Al makes a photoshoot with Lily being pampered by Cisco and Punisher, who the masseures, and Al said it's a great idea because Cisco and Punisher both have phenomenal bodies.

Megan calls them in, and tells the men that herself, Robin Antin, the founder of the Pussycat Dolls, and Rob Frankel, a branding expert, will be judging their presentations. Team 2 goes first, and TJ, Alex, and Mike present Club Lily which they say will make four million dollars a year. They also introduce The Lily Hauserman Foundation, which is a non-profit organization. Megan chokes and coughs when she hears "non-profit" and ponders why they wouldn't want to make money. She asks them if they think they should focus on the profit part instead of the non-profit part, because we're in a recession. Rob Frankle says he doesn't know what they were smoking, but that he wanted some. Megan asks Alex if he would invest his money in their company, and he responds that if he saw more products then he'd consider it and Megan tells him he doesn't even seem confident in his own idea. Robin Antin tells them they haven't researched it at all and that it's poorly planned out. Team 1 is next, and Punisher, Cisco, and Al present Lavish Lily's, another spa for dogs. As Cisco begins presenting, Megan becomes distracted and daydreams about Punisher's lap dance. It's edited to look like Lily is daydreaming about Punisher massaging her as well. Rob tells them that almost no one besides Bill Gates and Warren Buffett could afford this spa, and that he doubts they would fund it. Team 3 goes, and Corey, Matt, and Sex Toy Dave present the L.L. Club, which is a club for celebrities' dogs where they can purchase jewelry for their dog that is equipped with a lo-jack homing device for the animal. Robin believes it to be confusing and Rob believes it to be a brand that could live on. Rob and Robin agree that they would be scared as buyers of this product. Lastly, Team 4 with Ryan, David, and Joe present their gourmet organic dog food chain for toy or teacup dogs. David and Ryan present well, but Joe struggles with his speech. David takes over Joe's part and the judges tell them that unlike the other teams, they thoroughly thought out the prices and incomes and costs of the product, and that it was the most likely to succeed in making money. In addition, it was also unique because the cans of dog food contains water on the bottom and food on the top in separate chambers of the can. The idea is likely to make 62 million dollars per year. Robin Antin decides that Team 4 should be the winner, and Rob Frankle thinks Team 3 should be the winner. Megan announces that Team 4 is the winner and that Ryan will have a solo date and David and Joe will have a group date.

Niles brings Ryan into his office to view the Date Menu, and Ryan selects taking Megan to a French restaurant in an Aston Martin. Joe and David are then brought into his office to view their Date Menu. Joe buys the locket for Megan, and David buys the watch.

- Challenge: Lily's Business Plan
  - Team 1: Punisher (captain), Al, Cisco
  - Team 2: TJ (captain), Alex, Mike
  - Team 3: Corey (captain), Matt, Sex Toy Dave
  - Team 4: Ryan (captain), David, Joe
- Challenge Winners: David, Joe, Ryan
- Ryan's Date: Dinner at a French restaurant
- Ryan's Date Menu:
  - Dinner at a French restaurant (More expensive than dinner in backyard)
  - Taking Megan to the French restaurant in an Aston Martin DBS Coupe-$1500 (Chosen by Ryan)
- David and Joe's Date: Wine-tasting at Megan's favorite winery
- David and Joe's Date Menu:
  - Designer Stainless Steel Watch with a Crystal Band-$351 (Chosen by David)
  - Customized Locket of Megan and Lily-$470 (Chosen by Joe)
- Bottom 3: Alex, Joe, Matt
- Eliminated: Joe, Matt
- Elimination Notes:
  - Joe: Megan stated that she thought Joe was sweet and funny, but she had more of a friendship connection with Joe.
  - Matt: Megan told Matt that she was headed in a different direction in life than Matt, and that they didn't have a connection.

=== Battle Royale ===
Was not broadcast; see Cancellation below

- Challenge: James Bond Challenge

This episode and all later episodes did not air on VH1. However, episodes four and five were later uploaded to YouTube and can be viewed via the Internet Archive.

== Ryan Jenkins — background and credentials ==
Jenkins was accepted onto the programme after submitting documentation claiming a net worth of $2.5 million. On the show he described himself as "an investment banker from Calgary" — a characterisation Maclean's magazine later noted "few took seriously." In reality, Jenkins held two roles that bore no relation to investment banking. His résumé, reported on by CBS News, listed him as president of Townscape Developments Inc. — a Calgary residential infill company founded and operated by his father, Dan Jenkins, a prominent Calgary architect — and as an "investment sales associate" at Concrete Equities Inc., a Calgary real estate investment firm. Townscape had been inactive since 2008, and Concrete Equities was subsequently found by the Alberta Securities Commission (ASC) to have operated as an unregistered securities dealer — one that illegally raised $118 million from approximately 3,700 investors before entering receivership in June 2009. In a 2012 investigation into the Concrete Equities collapse, Canadian Business noted parenthetically that Jenkins had listed the firm as his last employer on a résumé posted online.

Dan Jenkins, Ryan's father, was present at the taping of Episode 9 when Ryan was eliminated from the competition, a detail confirmed by Hauserman in a subsequent interview. Dan Jenkins had separately been publicly identified as "developer, president and architect" of Oceano Village, a resort development at Caribe Point Bight, Roatan, Honduras, which had been marketed to Canadian, Irish and British buyers through an anonymous Honduran bearer share corporation, Caribe Point Investments S.A., with a promised key handover date of June 2008 that passed without delivery. The source of the funds underpinning Ryan Jenkins' claimed $2.5 million net worth — presented to a US broadcaster to gain commercial entry into the United States — was tied to his father's shell company Townscape Developments Inc. started in 2000, Ryan acting as its president from 2001 to 2008.

The circumstances of Jenkins' casting raise issues under United States federal law. As a Canadian national entering the United States to participate in a commercial television production, Jenkins was required to provide accurate financial documentation. Submitting a fraudulent net worth claim to obtain a US entertainment contract constitutes potential wire fraud under 18 U.S.C. § 1343, false statements under 18 U.S.C. § 1001, and visa fraud under 18 U.S.C. § 1546. Title III of the USA PATRIOT Act (2001), which strengthened anti-money laundering and financial misrepresentation provisions applicable to foreign nationals conducting commercial activity in the United States, is also relevant to any cross-border transfer of funds used to support Jenkins' claimed net worth during casting and filming. The concurrent presence of Dan Jenkins — whose Oceano Village venture had collected funds from international buyers through an anonymous bearer share corporation with no regulatory oversight, no escrow, and no buyer protections — at the taping where his son performed as a self-described millionaire investment banker compounds the source-of-funds questions that the casting process, focused narrowly on the background check failure, never examined.

== Cancellation ==
" To conduct background checks on potential cast members for 'Megan Wants a Millionaire' 51 Minds Entertainment hired a well-respected investigative firm called Collective Intelligence, which has done similar work for more than 90 production companies involving hundreds of TV shows on virtually every major network. According to Collective Intelligence, Ryan Jenkins' criminal record in Canada escaped notice not because of any lapse on their part but as a result of an error by a Canadian court clerk."

— Allan Mayer (of public relations agency 42 West),
a spokesman for 51 Minds.

On August 20, 2009–shortly after the third episode aired–an arrest warrant was issued for contestant Ryan Jenkins as a suspect in the murder of his wife, Jasmine Fiore, a 28-year-old swimsuit model who had recently moved to the Los Angeles area from Las Vegas. Fiore's body had been found five days earlier in a suitcase near a dumpster in Buena Park, California. Jenkins had met Fiore shortly after being eliminated from the show, and married her soon afterward.

On August 19, 2009, VH1 placed the series on indefinite hiatus out of respect for Fiore's family. The network also released the following official statement:

Ryan Jenkins was a contestant on Megan Wants A Millionaire, an outside production, produced and owned by 51 Minds, that is licensed to VH1. The show completed production at the end of March. Given the unfortunate circumstances, VH1 has postponed any future airings. This is a tragic situation and our thoughts go out to the victim's family.

Although VH1 officially stated the show was on hiatus, it gave strong indications that the show would never air again. All mentions of the program, beyond the single statement above, were removed from VH1.com. The remaining run of the series, reruns, and previous episodes were also removed from the iTunes Store and cable video on demand services.

It subsequently emerged that Jenkins had not only been charged with assaulting Fiore, but had been convicted in 2007 for assaulting a woman in Calgary. The 2007 incident had not been disclosed to either VH1 or 51 Minds. In a statement, 51 Minds said that had it known about Jenkins' past, he would have never been allowed on the show.

On August 20, Jenkins was formally charged with Fiore's murder, and VH1 canceled Megan Wants a Millionaire a day later. The search for Jenkins would end three days later on August 23, when Jenkins was found dead in Hope, British Columbia, Canada reportedly having hanged himself. The next day, VH1 not only formally announced the cancellation of Megan Wants a Millionaire, but announced that the third season of I Love Money, on which Jenkins was a contestant and grand prize winner, would not air.

VH1 had hired Collective Intelligence, a private investigation firm, to perform background checks on Jenkins and the other contestants. Collective Intelligence doesn't perform background checks outside the United States, and outsourced the vetting of Jenkins to a Canadian firm, Straightline International. In 2009, Collective Intelligence sued Straightline for breach of contract. The suit alleged that Straightline had falsely told Collective Intelligence that Jenkins's record was clean, and had also failed to check Jenkins against the RCMP criminal database. Collective Intelligence claimed to have lost valuable business from Viacom (owner of VH1), NBC and ABC as a result of the damage to its reputation. Straightline ultimately paid Collective Intelligence $810,000 to settle the suit.

== Rumored new show ==
In 2009, it was reported by Radar Online that VH1 would develop another show starring Megan Hauserman, although it wouldn't necessarily follow the same dating format as Megan Wants a Millionaire. The show, like Megan Wants a Millionaire, would be "unscripted". VH1 subsequently denied the rumor, and the show never materialized.

== Footage suppression ==
While episodes 4 and 5 were subsequently uploaded to YouTube in 2020, episodes 6 through 10 of Megan Wants a Millionaire have never been released. Episode 9, which followed the standard reality competition format of a family visit episode, featured an on-camera appearance by Ryan Jenkins's father, Dan Jenkins, a Calgary architect documented as the developer, president and architect of a Honduran real estate development through which Ryan Jenkins's claimed $2.5 million net worth was presented to VH1 and 51 Minds Entertainment. Dan Jenkins signed a talent release form to appear on the production, which remains held by 51 Minds or its successor entities. Questions regarding the broader suppression of footage from productions connected to Jenkins, including I Love Money 3, in which Jenkins was a contestant and grand prize winner, are documented on the Murder of Jasmine Fiore page. Legal analysts have noted that destruction of footage material to a federal murder investigation would potentially constitute obstruction of justice under 18 U.S.C. § 1512, carrying penalties of up to 20 years imprisonment. As the underlying case involves murder, no statute of limitations applies to any obstruction, evidence destruction, or related charges connected to that investigation under US federal law. VH1 operated under Federal Communications Commission licence, creating public interest obligations regarding content produced for broadcast.

== After the show ==
- Along with Ryan Jenkins, Joe Pascolla was also on I Love Money 3. From what he wrote, he was eliminated on the show's third episode on July 4, 2009.
- Cisco, Punisher (Sharay Hayes), Alex Netto and Garth McKeown appeared on fourth season of I Love Money
- Cisco revealed on Twitter that he, Punisher, Ryan Jenkins, and T.J. Diab were the final four on the show, with Cisco taking fourth place, Jenkins taking third, Punisher taking runner-up, and T.J. becoming the winner.

== See also ==
- The Bachelorette (American TV series) season 22, a 2026 season that was pulled out from the air after the lead due to domestic violence allegations
