= BMW 335 =

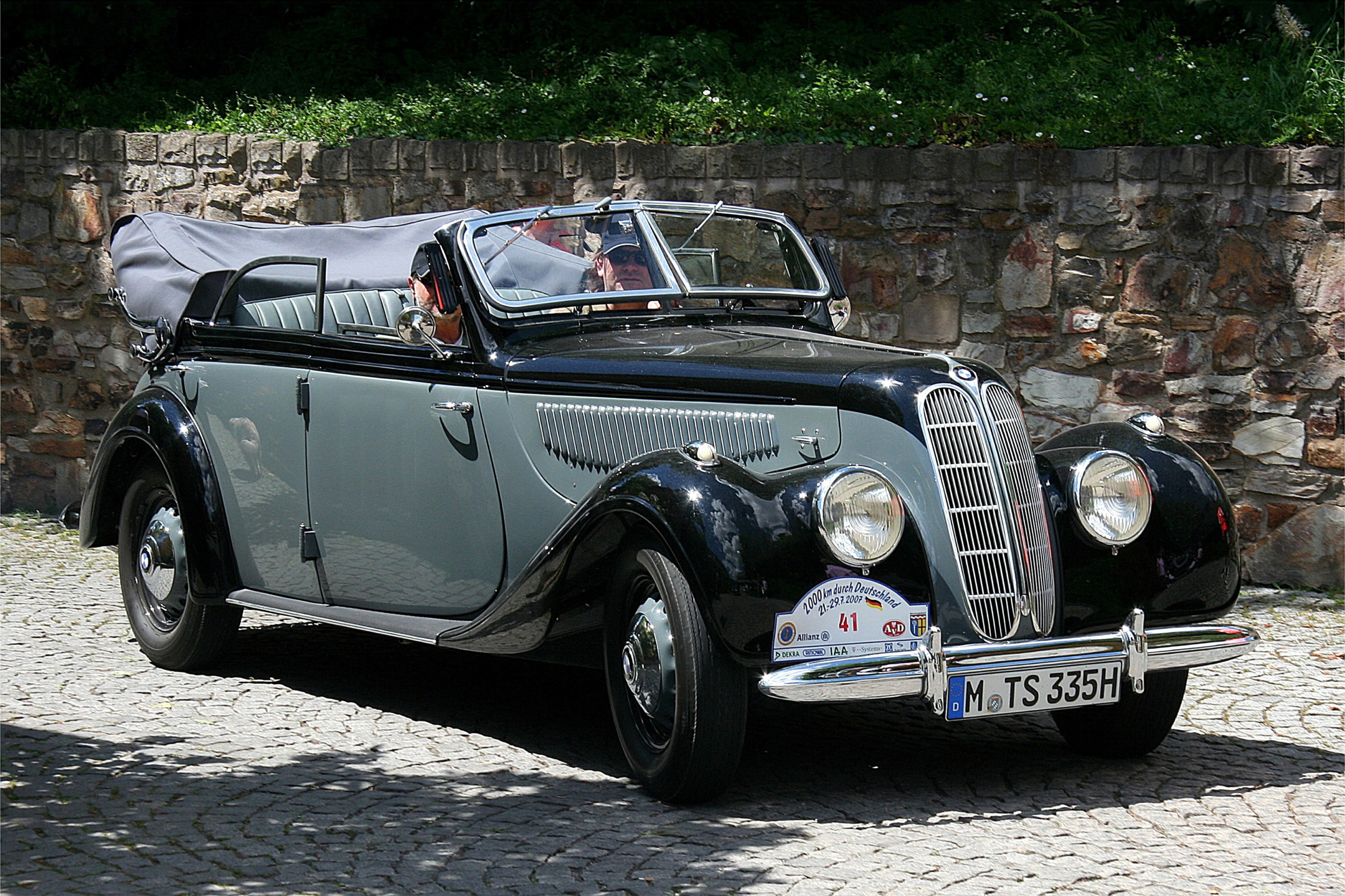
- BMW 335 4-door Cabriolet

Overview
- Manufacturer: BMW
- Production: 1939–1941; 420 built (estimated)
- Assembly: Germany: Eisenach
- Designer: Fritz Fiedler

Body and chassis
- Class: Full-size luxury car
- Body style: 4-door saloon, 2 & 4-door cabriolets
- Layout: FR layout
- Related: BMW 326

Powertrain
- Engine: 3485 cc OHV M335 Straight 6
- Transmission: 4-speed manual all- synchromesh

Dimensions
- Wheelbase: 2,980 mm (117 in)
- Length: 4,840 mm (191 in)
- Width: 1,700 mm (67 in)
- Height: 1,690 mm (67 in)
- Curb weight: 1,300 kg (2,900 lb) (measurements approximate)

Chronology
- Successor: BMW 501

The BMW 335 is a six-cylinder sports sedan produced by the Bavarian firm BMW between 1939 and 1941.

== Conception ==
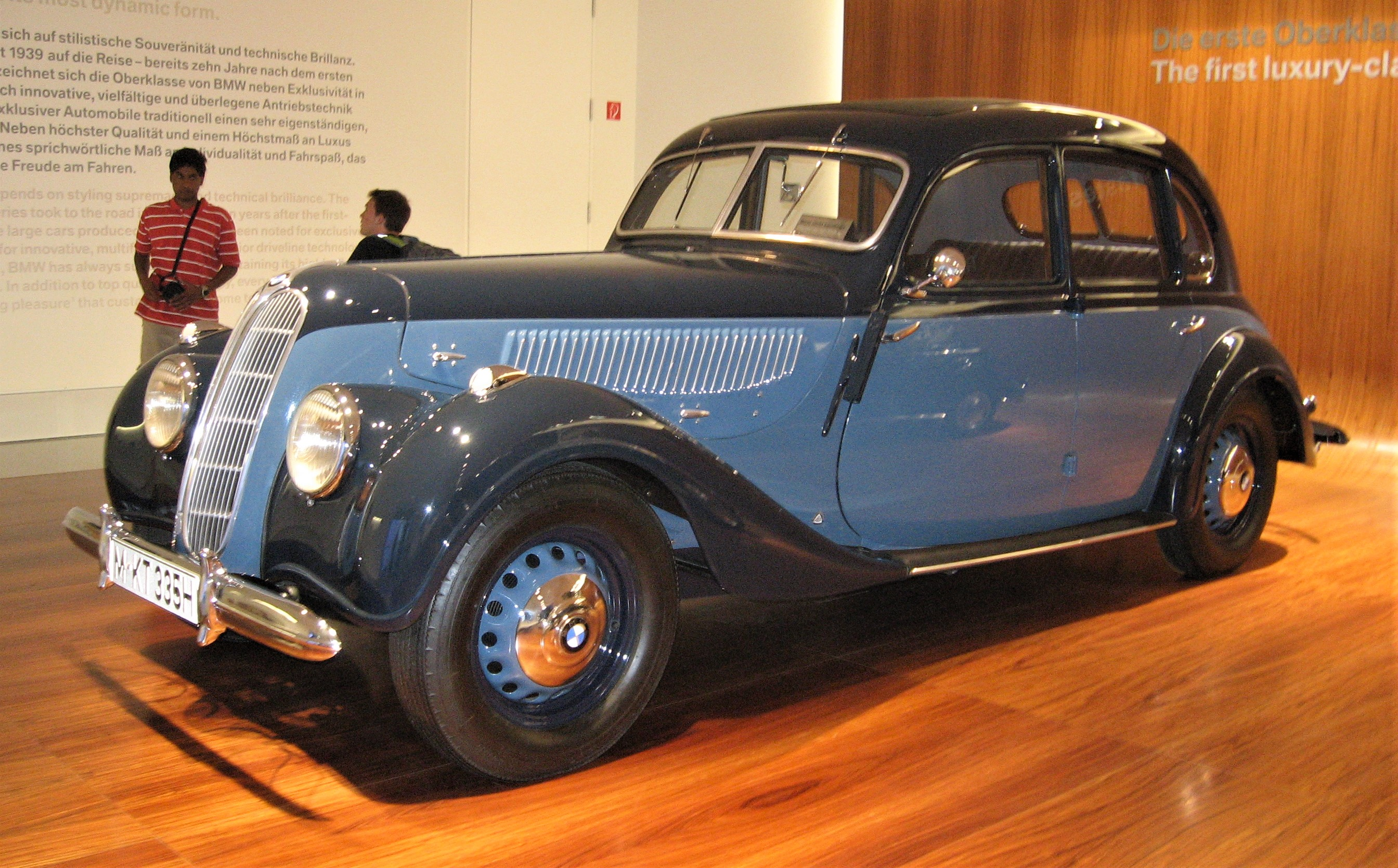
BMW 335 4-door Berline (front view)

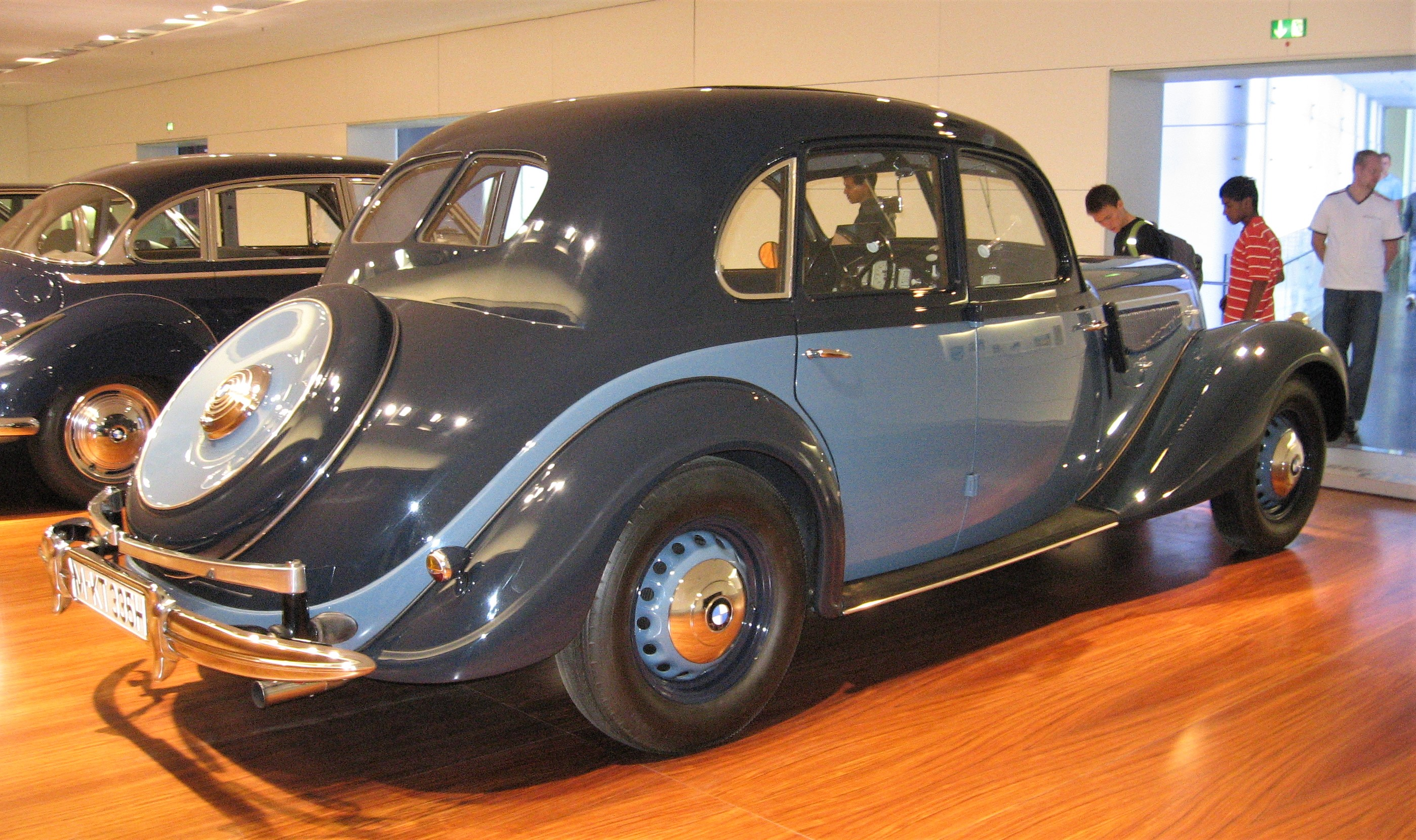
BMW 335 4-door Berline (rear view)

Commercial success for the BMW 326, introduced in 1936, encouraged a move upmarket. This would involve BMW in challenging the dominance then enjoyed by Mercedes-Benz over a lucrative sector, with their 320 and 340 models.

BMW were producing, in their Eisenach plant, the model that would form the basis for the larger car. The 326 had already spawned successful sporting derivatives. The 335 was also to be based on the 326, but with the wheelbase and chassis extended to accommodate a 3485 cc M335 six-cylinder in-line engine. Despite clearly reflecting the approach taken with existing BMW units, this was an entirely new design. Claimed maximum power output of 90 bhp (67 kW) was lower than the values advertised for comparably sized and powered Jaguars of the period, it achieved full power at only 3500 rpm. With 90 bhp (67 kW), the car had top speed of 145 km/h (90 mph).

The engine’s additional weight prompted the fitting of larger brake drums and wheels than on the 326. The 335 sustained BMW’s reputation for innovation, being the first car to offer a four-speed gear box with full synchromesh on all ratios.

The car was sold as a four-door sedan and as a two- or (more unusually) four-door cabriolet.

== Launch ==
A prototype 335 was first presented at London in 1938. The car was branded for these purposes as a Frazer Nash. There had been close relations between BMW and England ever since BMW had established themselves in the small-car market by building a version of the English Austin 7. Frazer Nash had been BMW’s English importers since 1934, and after the war BMW design chief Fritz Fiedler, the man primarily responsible for designing and developing the 335, would for several years work with Frazer Nash’s successor company in London.

The production version was launched on the German market as the BMW 335 in 1939.

== End of production ==
The German invasion of Poland in September 1939 triggered the Second World War. Initially, aspects of Germany's peacetime economy persisted, and BMW were able to produce 335s at their Eisenach facility. Perfect production records are thought not to survive, but it appears by the time passenger car production ceased in 1941, more than 400 had been assembled.
