= Strength of a Woman =

Strength of a Woman may refer to:

- Strength of a Woman (album), by Mary J. Blige
- Strength of a Woman (song), by Shaggy
- "Strength of a Woman", a 1980 song by Eloise Laws, later covered by The Carpenters
- "The Strength of a Woman", a 1998 song by Phyllis Hyman from her album Forever with You
- "Strength of a Woman", a 2001 song by Geri Halliwell from her album Scream If You Wanna Go Faster
- "Strength of a Woman", a 2002 song by Shaggy from his album Lucky Day
