= Jay Boberg =

American entertainment and viticulture executive

- Born: 1958 (age 67–68); San Francisco, CA
- Education: UCLA
- Occupations: Music industry and viticulture executive
- Years active: 1978–present

Jay Robert Boberg (born in 1958) is an American music, entertainment and viticulture executive. He co-founded the independent record label I.R.S. Records in 1979, and later served as the president of Universal/MCA Music Publishing and the president of MCA Records. He is the founder of the entertainment company Liberation Entertainment and is chairman of the Isolation Entertainment board of directors. In 2013, he co-founded the winery Domaine Nicolas-Jay in Oregon with Méo Camuzet owner and winemaker, Jean-Nicolas Méo.

== Early life ==
Boberg is a fourth-generation Californian, born in San Francisco to Richard and Shirley Boberg. He attended Miraleste High School in Rancho Palos Verdes, graduating in 1976 and was an avid classical guitar musician starting at age 7. Attending the Who’s Quadrophenia tour in 1974 was a watershed music moment after which Boberg's musical orientation changed.

== Music industry career ==
Always listening to and creating music, Boberg played guitar in local bands in his youth, but he soon embarked into the business side of music, producing two major talent concerts at Miraleste High School: one with seminal surf band, HONK, and another with ’70s folk artists Kenny Rankin and Tim Weisberg. After he enrolled at UCLA in 1976, he continued his concert promotion efforts running UCLA's Campus Events concerts booking Peter Gabriel’s first solo show, Talking Heads first tour in LA, Bob Marley and many other such artists. In 1978 he began working as a college representative for A&M Records. While working on the marketing and promotion of the first U.S. tour of the British band The Police, Boberg met the band's manager, Miles Axe Copeland III. In early 1979, Copeland recruited Boberg, who was still just a junior at UCLA, to join him in creating a new record label, focused on the emerging punk and new wave music scenes, particularly up-and-coming UK bands that were not getting much attention in the U.S. That label was I.R.S. Records, founded in September 1979 in Los Angeles.

Boberg and Copeland soon built up the label, which had a distribution deal with the Police's label, A&M Records, into a successful independent. Once they demonstrated the appeal of the UK bands that launched the label, I.R.S. started signing American bands, including Dead Kennedys, Oingo Boingo, Wall of Voodoo and, notably, soon-to-be superstars The Go-Go's and Boberg's discovery, R.E.M. The label continued to have success, with Concrete Blonde, Fine Young Cannibals, The Alarm and others.

Contributing to the label's success was maintaining a roster of fewer than 20 artists when major labels typically had upwards of 100 or more acts signed. I.R.S. also stuck to its mantra of fiscal responsibility.

Launching around the same time MTV was emerging, I.R.S. expanded its brand with the television show I.R.S. Records Presents The Cutting Edge, which aired from 1983 to 1987 on MTV. Boberg executive produced the show with producer and I.R.S. Records' creative director Carl Grasso and directors Jonathan Dayton and Valerie Faris. The show was known for introducing new acts to the channel, and for its left-field tastes that helped launch careers.

Although the Go-Go's were the first breakout stars for the label, I.R.S. enjoyed its greatest success with college radio-bred R.E.M. Even as its success grew, the band stayed with the label, in part because of the encouragement and support it received from the label, especially Boberg. For his part, Boberg felt the respect was mutual.

Originally hired as executive vice president of I.R.S. in 1979, Boberg was named president of the label five years later, with Copeland saying “Jay has functionally been running the record label for some time. This formalizes it.”

== MCA Records ==
In 1989, I.R.S. signed a five-year distribution deal with MCA Records. In 1993, Boberg and Copeland sold I.R.S. Records to EMI, and Boberg headed off to Cambridge, Mass. to get his MBA at Harvard Business School at the behest of EMI Chairman Jim Fifield. Late in 1993 Boberg was named president of MCA Music Publishing, overseeing all music publishing operations worldwide. In late 1995, Boberg was named President of MCA Records.

Long considered one of the music business’ underachievers, MCA Records under Boberg's leadership, "has transformed... from the last stop to the first stop for many dealmakers". Using the artist-friendly approach mixed with a fiscal prudence management style he developed while at the far smaller I.R.S. Records, Boberg had success with releases by artists Sublime, Mary J. Blige, Blink-182, Live, The Roots, New Radicals and others. Under his guidance, the rejuvenated MCA Records label was able to survive intact after a major restructuring when its parent Universal Music Group merged with PolyGram and other labels, which resulted in hundreds of employees losing their jobs at other labels, with very few at MCA Records.

The 2000 album Hot Shot from reggae artist Shaggy hit No. 1 on the Billboard 200 music charts, to the surprise of the music industry, finding massive crossover success. Boberg's low-cost strategy made MCA Records a key contributor to UMG's bottom tier of labels. The 2001 release of Blige's album No More Drama did well on its initial release, and after the label rejiggered it six months later, then re-released it, the album reconnected with a broader audience.

Major upheavals were happening all over the music business when strategies that had worked previously ran up against a rapidly shrinking record label business. MCA would release their last album, Twisted Method's Escape from Cape Coma, on July 15, 2003. The album was a commercial disaster and the lack of promotion was blamed on MCA's shuttering status. Furthermore, in 2003, after eight years running MCA Records, Boberg left. In his farewell message to MCA Records employees, Boberg said that when he started at MCA, the label's roster “was anemic; the artistic reputation in tatters” and that “the MCA that I leave behind is an artistic and musical gold mine.” Most of the current artist roster and staff from MCA were moved over to Geffen during the merge later that year.

== Liberation Entertainment ==
After taking some time off, Boberg re-entered the entertainment business in 2006 by purchasing Liberty Int. Entertainment, renaming it Liberation Entertainment and setting out to capitalize on its library of 250 films and 2,500 hours of television, to service the then-booming home entertainment business. One of his initiatives was the launch of “Soundies”, a partnership with PBS that was a two-hour special, composed of three-minute music video clips from the 1940s.

Before the DVD business collapsed, Boberg took a stand on behalf of the format, and especially the enduring appeal of music DVDs. Speaking at the annual Music DVD Conference in 2007, Boberg argued on behalf of music DVDs. “You could see that a music title, a year from now or two years from now will have value. You have to wonder what the relative value of most movies are two years later.”

== INgrooves ==
In 2010 Boberg joined the board of Isolation Network, an independent digital music distributor. In 2012 he was named chairman of the board of Isolation, soon after leading the acquisition of independent label Fontana from his old employer, Universal Music Group. The company took on the name INgrooves. He continued as chairman of the INgrooves board until overseeing the sale of the company to Universal Music Group in March 2019.

== Domaine Nicolas-Jay ==
Even as he built his career as a music industry executive, Boberg developed a passion for wine. He started by buying a Cabernet Sauvignon vineyard in California's Napa Valley in 1989 while running his label businesses. But by 2013, his side project became his prime focus. Boberg and his old friend, French winemaker Jean-Nicolas Méo, opened Domaine Nicolas-Jay winery in Oregon, focusing on French Burgundian Pinot Noir wines. Boberg sees the music business and the wine business as being very similar: “There are a startling array of similarities between the worlds of wine and music, and also with the creative process of making wine and making music. In the wine business, gatekeepers decide yes or no to list the wine on a wine list or carry a wine in their shop. In music, gatekeepers are music directors at radio stations or record store owners or playlist creators.”

== Personal life ==
Boberg married Alison Cooper in 1989, and they have two children. The couple divorced in 2015. Boberg currently splits his time between homes in Santa Monica and Dundee in the Willamette Valley in Oregon.
