= List of fandom names =

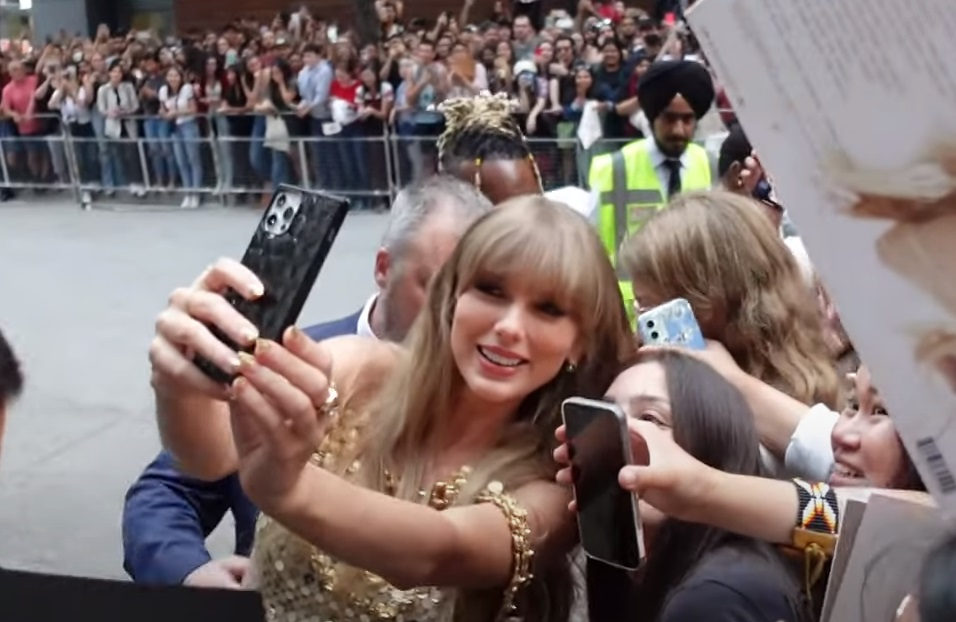
Taylor Swift posing with Swifties

Many fandoms in popular culture have their own names that distinguish them from other fan communities. These names are popular with singers, music groups, films, authors, television shows, books, games, sports teams, and actors. Some of the terms are coined by fans while others are created by celebrities themselves.

The trend of giving a name to a group of fans became more common and widespread during the beginning of the 21st century, with the development of social media, although such names were incidentally used much earlier.

== List ==
Object	Fanbase nickname	Type	Notes	Ref.
=== # ===
&Team	Luné	Music Group	Stands for "Light Up New Energy"	
&Juliet	Amperstans	Musical	"Amper-" from the ampersand in the show's name and "-stans" as another name for fans	
1st.One	ForOne	Music group		
2NE1	Blackjack	Music group		
2PM	Hottest	Music group		
4Eve	For Eye	Music group	Also means "forever"	
4th Impact	Dreamers	Music group		
5 Seconds of Summer	5SOSFam	Music group		
@onefive	@fifth	Music group	The "@" symbol is silent.	
=== A ===
AB6IX	ABNEW	Music group	The name indicates "A sixth member that will become one with AB6IX and walk a new path with them together."	
A.C.E	Choice	Music group		
Adam Lambert	Glamberts	Musician		
Adéla	Adélarinas	Musician		
Adele	Daydreamers	Musician	Named after the song "Daydreamer" from her album 19	
Aerosmith	Blue Army	Music group		
Aespa	My	Music group		
Alamat	Magiliw	Music group		
Alan Walker	Walkers	Musician		
Alden Richards & Maine Mendoza	AlDubNation	Actor	AlDub is a portmanteau of the names of two actors	
Alita: Battle Angel	Alita Army	Film		
Ally Brooke	Allygiance	Musician		
Alpha Drive One	ALLYZ	Music group		
Akshay Kumar	Akkians	Actor		
Amefurasshi	Colors	Music group		
Andrew Cuomo	Cuomosexuals	Politician		
Andrew Yang	Yang Gang	Politician		
Anitta	Anitters	Musician		
Apink	Pink Panda	Music group		
Aquabats	Aquacadets	Music group		
Ariana Grande	Arianators	Musician	originally called "the Ariana army" and "Tiny Elephants" by Grande before fans gave themselves the name "Arianators". Grande has shown a dislike to the name multiple times.	
Arlo Parks	Angels	Musician		
Armaan Malik	Armaanians	Musician		
Arnold Palmer	Arnie's Army	Athlete		
Arsenal F.C.	Gooners	Sports team	Derived from the team's nickname, the "Gunners"	
Ashnikko	Demidevils	Musician	Named after her 2021 breakout mixtape Demidevil	
Ateez	ATINY	Music group	A combination of "Ateez" and "destiny", indicating that Ateez and their fans were always destined to meet.	
Audrey	Little Toos	Comedian		
Audrey Nuna	Nunatics	Musician		
Aurora	Warriors & Weirdos	Musician		
Austin Mahone	Mahomies	Musician		
Ava Max	Avatars	Musician		
Avatar	Avatards	Film	Alternative: Na'vi Nation	
Avril Lavigne	Black Stars	Musician	Named after the song "Black Star"	
Ayra Starr	Mobstarrs	Musician		
Ayumi Hamasaki	Team Ayu	Musician	Often abbreviated to "TA"	
Azealia Banks	Kunt Brigade	Musician		
=== B ===
B1A4	Bana	Music group		
Brave Girls	Fearless	Music group		
B.A.P	BABY	Music group		
Baby Tate	Tater Tots	Musician		
Babymetal	The One	Music group	Named from their English-language song "The One"	
Babymonster	Monstiez	Music group		
Band-Maid	Goshujin-sama, Ojō-sama	Music group	Based on the names used to greet patrons at maid cafés	
Barry Manilow	Fanilows	Musician		
Bars & Melody	Bambinos	Music group		
Batman	Batmaniacs	Comics / Film		
Beast	B2uty	Music group	Pronounced "Beauty"	
The Beatles	Beatlemaniacs	Music group	Hardcore fans used to be called Apple scruffs	
Bebe Rexha	Rexhars	Musician		
Becky G	Beasters	Musician		
Bella Thorne	Bellarinas	Actress		
Ben Platt	Platties	Musician		
Benedict Cumberbatch	Cumberbitches	Actor		
Beyoncé	Beyhive	Musician	Pronounced and named after 'beehive'	
Big Bang	V.I.P	Music group		
The Big Lebowski	Achievers	Film		
Billlie	Belllie've	Music group		
BINI	Bloom(s)	Music group	Commonly stylized as BL$\infty$M(S) with the infinity symbol replacing the Os taking inspiration from the group's tagline "Walo hanggang dulo" (Eight until the end).	
Blackpink	Blinks	Music group		
Black Veil Brides	BVB Army	Music group		
Bob Dylan	Dylanologists	Musician		
Boston Red Sox	Red Sox Nation	Sports team	Term was coined by a journalist in 1986; officially adopted by the team in 2004.	
BoyNextDoor	ONEDOOR	Music group		
The Boyz	The B	Music group		
Bree Runway	Runwayz	Musician		
Britney Spears	Britney Army	Musician		
Bruno Mars	Hooligans	Musician	Named after his 2010 debut album Doo-Wops & Hooligans	
Bros	Brosettes	Music group		
Bruce Springsteen	Bruce Tramps	Musician		
BtoB	Melody	Music group		
BTS	A.R.M.Y	Music group	A.R.M.Y is an acronym for Adorable Representative MC for Youth	
Buffalo Bills	Bills Mafia	Sports team	Coined ca. 2010.	
=== C ===
California Chrome	Chromies	Racehorse		
Camila Cabello	Camilizers	Musician		
Cardi B	Bardi Gang	Musician		
Cardiacs	The Pond, Pondies	Music group	Tim Smith would address his fans as "fish" swimming in the "pond" at gigs.	
Carly Rae Jepsen	Jepsies	Musician		
C.D. Guadalajara	Chivas	Sports team		
Ceechynaa	Legal Babies	Musician		
Chancho en Piedra	Marranos	Music group		
Chapo Trap House	Grey Wolves	Podcast		
Charli XCX	Angels	Musician		
Charlie Puth	Puthinators	Musician		
Chel Diokno	Cheldren	Politician		
Cher	Cher Crew	Musician		
Cher Lloyd	Brats	Musician	Named after Simon Cowell called her a brat on The X Factor	
Chlöe Bailey	Chlövers	Musician		
Chloe x Halle	Sirens	Music duo		
Chris Brown	Team Breezy	Musician		
Chris Pine	Pine-Nuts	Actor		
Christina Aguilera	Fighters	Musician	Named after her 2002 song Fighter	
Christina Grimmie	Team Grimmie	Musician		
Christopher Nolan	Nolanites	Director		
City Girls	Citizens, City Girls, City Boys	Music duo		
CKY	CKY Alliance	Music group		
Clay Aiken	Claymates	Musician		
Club América	Águilas	Sports teams		
CLC	Cheshire	Music group	Inspired by the Cheshire Cat, a fictional character from Lewis Carroll's Alice's Adventures in Wonderland	
CNBLUE	Boice	Music group		
CNCO	CNCOwners	Music group		
Coheed and Cambria	Children of the Fence	Music group	A reference to the fictional universe that most of the band's albums take place in, Heaven's Fence	
Coldplay	Coldplayers	Music group		
Community	Human Beings	TV show	Named after the Greendale Human Being, the mascot for Greendale Community College, the fictional college that the show predominantly takes place at	
Conan Gray	Coneheads	Musician		
Conan O'Brien	Coconuts	Comedian		
Conor Maynard	Mayniacs	Musician		
Cortis	COER	Music group		
Critical Role	Critters	Web series		
Cupcakke	Slurpers	Musician		
Cup of Joe	Joewahs	Music group	A portmanteau of Joe and the Filipino slang term jowa, which means boyfriend, girlfriend, or romantic partner	
=== D ===
Dan and Phil	Phandom	YouTubers	A pun of the portmanteau of Phil Lester's and Daniel Howell's names—"Phan"—and the word "fandom".	
Danny Gonzalez	Greg	YouTuber	In one of his videos, Gonzalez looked up "Strong Names" on Google and found the name "Gregory," which he shortened to Greg, and declared it a "good, strong name."	
DAY6	My Day	Music group		
Deadsy	Leigons	Music group		
Dear Evan Hansen	Fansens	Musical		
Debby Ryan	Deboraliens	Actor		
Delta Goodrem	The Tribe	Musician		
Demi Lovato	Lovatics	Musician		
Danish national football team	Roligans	Sports team		
Depeche Mode	Modies, devotees	Music group		
Der Ring des Nibelungen	Ringheads	Opera	The other term is Ringnuts.	
Dewa 19	Baladewa	Music group		
Dick Dale	Dickheads	Musician		
Dimash Kudaibergen	Dears	Musician		
Dinah Jane	Dinahsty	Musician		
Divergent	Initiates	Book		
Doctor Who	Whovians	TV show		
Doechii	The Swamp	Musician	Formerly called the "Coven"	
Doja Cat	Kittenz	Musician		
Dolla (girl group)	iDollas	Music group		
Dove Cameron	Dovelies	Musician		
Downfall	Untergangers	Film	Named after the original German title, Der Untergang	
Drain Gang	Drainers	Artistic collective		
Drake	Team Drizzy	Musician		
Dreamcatcher	InSomnia	Music group		
Dua Lipa	Loves	Musician	Named after poll on Twitter made to her fans	
Ducati	Ducatisti	Motorcycle		
Duran Duran	Durannies	Music group		
=== E ===
Ed Miliband	Milifans	Politician		
Ed Sheeran	Sheerios	Musician		
Ella Langley	Ella's Fellas	Musician		
Ellie Goulding	Goulddiggers	Musician		
Eminem	Stans	Musician	Named after his song "Stan"	
Emma Watkins	Mini-Emma Army	Musician		
Emmure	Decepticons	Music group		
Encantadia	Encantadiks	TV show		
England cricket team	Barmy Army	Sports team		
Enhypen	ENGENE	Music group		
Ethel Cain	Daughters of Cain	Musician		
Everglow	Forever	Music group		
Eurovision Song Contest	Eurofans	Music competition		
Exo	Exo-L	Music group	The 'L' in "Exo-L" stands for Love, and in alphabetical order, L is the 12th letter and links the letters K (Exo-K) and M (Exo-M). Exo-L is considered a sub-unit of Exo, so that Exo-K + Exo-L + Exo-M = One. As in the band's slogan "WE ARE ONE!", meaning the band members and the fans are One.	
The Expanse	Screaming Firehawks	TV show	Named after the "Screaming Firehawk", a proposed new name for the space gunship Tachi in Season 1. In season 5 the racing spaceship Razorback was renamed The Screaming Firehawk as a tribute to the fans who successfully campaigned for the renewal of the show in 2018.	
=== F ===
Fall Out Boy	Youngbloods	Music group		
Father Ted	Tedheads	TV show		
FC Barcelona	Culés	Sports team		
Ferrari	Tifosi	Automobile	Also applies to racing teams supported by the manufacturer	
Feyenoord	Het Legioen	Sports team		
Fifth Harmony	Harmonizers	Music group		
Fifty Fifty	Hunnies, Tweny	Music group		
Firefly	Browncoats	TV show		
Five Finger Death Punch	Knuckleheads	Music group		
FLO	FLO Lifers	Music group		
FKA Twigs	Twiglets	Musician		
Flo Milli	Flomillitary	Musician		
Frank Sinatra	Bobby soxers	Musician		
Fright Night	Fringies	TV show	Fans of the show or Sinister Seymour, the host	
Fromis 9	Flover	Music Group	Written in Korean as 플로버	
F.T. Island	Primadonna	Music group		
Future	FutureHive	Musician		
=== G ===
Game Grumps	Lovelies	Web series		
Game of Thrones	Thronies	TV show		
Gary Numan	Numanoids	Musician		
Geraldine Farrar	Gerry-flappers	Soprano		
GFriend	Buddy	Music group		
Ghostbusters	Ghostheads	Film		
(G)I-dle	Neverland	Music group	Referencing Peter Pan's Neverland. The meaning of "remain being children in Neverland" comes from (G)I-dle's Korean name, which contains the words "girl" and "children".	
Gigi	Gigi Kita	Music band		
Gilbert and Sullivan	Savoyards	Librettist / Composer	Derived from the Savoy Theatre where operettas were performed. The term can also refer to performers of Gilbert and Sullivan works.	
Girl's Day	Dai5y	Music group		
Girls' Generation	Sone	Music group	Named after the song "소원 (Honey)"	
Girlset	Lockets	Music group		
Glee	Gleeks	TV show		
Gone with the Wind	Windies	Book		
Good Mythical Morning	Mythical Beasts	YouTube show		
GOT7	IGOT7	Music group		
Grace VanderWaal	FanderWaals	Musician		
The Great Kat	Kat Slaves	Musician		
Green Bay Packers	Cheeseheads	Sports team		
Grateful Dead	Deadheads	Music group		
Gravity Falls	Fallers	TV Show		
Guns N' Roses	Gunners	Music group		
=== H ===
Hamilton: An American Musical	Hamilfans	Musical	Alternately used: Familtons, Hammies, Alexander Familtons, HamFam or Hamiltrash	
Hannah Hart	Hartosexuals	YouTuber		
Hannibal	Fannibals	TV show		
Hanson	Fansons	Music group		
Harry Potter	Potterheads	Book	Non-fans are often called Muggles	
Harry Styles	Harries	Musician / Actor		
Hasan Piker	Hasanabi Heads, Parasocialists	Twitch streamer		
Hayden Christensen	Stanakins	Actor	Combination of the word "stan" and the character Anakin Skywalker, which was portrayed by Christensen.	
Hello Internet	Tims	Podcast		
Hey Violet	Ultraviolets	Music group		
Hinatazaka46	Ohisama	Music group	A slang for the Sun, since hinata means "sunny place"	
The Hunger Games	Tributes	Book		
Homestuck	Homestucks	Webcomic		
Howie Mandel	FANdels	Comedian		
Hulk Hogan	Hulkamaniacs	Wrestler		
=== I ===
IAMDDB	Waeveybbys	Musician		
Ice Spice	Munchkins	Musician	Named after her single "Munch".	
Iggy Azalea	Azaleans	Musician		
iKon	IKONIC	Music group		
Illit	GLLIT	Music group		
Imagine Dragons	Firebreathers	Music group		
Imogen Heap	Heapsters	Musician		
Indila	Dreamers	Musician	Because Indila says that we are made of dreams and that music breathes life and can make anything possible	
Infinite	Inspirit	Music group		
Insane Clown Posse	Juggalos	Music group	Female fans are called Juggalettes	
In This Moment	Blood Leigon	Music group		
Ita Purnamasari	Itamania	Musician		
Itzy	MIDZY	Music group	MIDZY is a play on the Korean word 믿지 (mid-ji) which means trust/believe. Itzy trusts/believes in MIDZY.	
IU	Uaena	Musician		
Ive	Dive	Music group		
Ivorian Doll	Dollz	Musician		
Iz*One	WIZ*ONE	Music group	Wiz is short for "wizard" and means that their fans will be with IZ*ONE helping them to create their magical future together.	
Izna	Naya	Music group		
=== J ===
JADE	Huns	Musician		
Jake Paul	Jake Paulers	YouTuber		
James Dean	Deaners	Actor		
James McAvoy	McAvoyeurs	Actor		
Jane Austen	Janeites	Author		
Janelle Monáe	Fandroids	Musician		
Janet Jackson	JanFam	Musician		
Jared Padalecki	Padalecki Stans, Jarpad Stans	Actor		
Javi Costa Polo	Luvs	Influencer		
Jaws	Finaddicts	Film		
JBJ	Joyful	Music group		
Jennette McCurdy	McCurdians	Actress		
Jennifer Lopez	JLovers	Musician / Actress		
Jensen Ackles	Ackleholics	Actor		
Jerma985	Jermamites	Streamer / YouTuber		
Jessie J	Heartbeats	Musician	Named after her 2011-2012 debut concert tour The Heartbeat Tour	
Jesy Nelson	Nelsonaters	Musician		
Jewel	EDAs	Musician	Short for Everyday Angels	
Jimmy Buffett	Parrotheads	Musician	Parakeets for younger fans or children of Parrotheads	
JO1	JAM	Music group		
Joel DELEŌN	DISTRICT D	Musician		
John Cena	Cenation	Wrestler		
John Iadarola	Dragon Squad	YouTuber		
Joker Out	Baby boos	Music group		
Jonaxx	JSL	Author	JSL is an acronym for Jonaxx Stories Lover	
Josh Groban	Grobanites	Musician		
Joss Whedon	Whedonites	Director		
Judas Priest	Metal Maniacs	Music group	Rob always addresses their fans this way.	
Jumpol Adulkittiporn & Atthaphan Phunsawat	Babii	Actor		
Justin Bieber	Beliebers	Musician		
Justin Timberlake	The TN Kids	Musician	TN is a state abbreviation for Tennessee	
=== K ===
K/DA	Blades	Music group	A reference to Akali's rap verse, "I'm a goddess with a blade" in "Pop/Stars".	
KAIA	Zaia	Music group		
Kali Uchis	Kuchis	Musician		
Kamala Harris	KHive	Politician		
Kang Daniel	Danity	Musician		
KARD	Hidden KARD	Music group		
Kathryn Bernardo & Daniel Padilla	KathNiels	Actor	Kath+Niel	
Katseye	Eyekons	Music group		
Katy Perry	KatyCats	Musician		
Kehlani	Tsunami Mob, Tsunami Gang	Musician		
Kelly Clarkson	Kellebrities	Musician		
Kelly Rowland	Rowland Stones	Musician		
Kendrick Lamar	Kenfolk	Musician		
Kenya Moore	Team Twirl	Actress	Alluding to her Miss USA title	
Kesha	Animals	Musician	Named after the song "Animal"	
The Killers	Victims	Music group		
KickFlip	WeFlip	Music group		
Kim Petras	Bunheads	Musician		
King Gizzard & the Lizard Wizard	Gizzheads, Weirdo Swarm	Music group		
Kiss	Kiss Army	Music group		
Kiss of Life	KISSY	Music group		
Krakatau	Keluarga Krakatau	Music group		
KREW	KF	YouTubers	Abbreviation for "Krewfam"	
Kumi Sasaki	Kumitens	Musician	Abbreviation for "Kumi Captain"	
Kylie Cantrall	QTs	Musician		
Kylie Minogue	Lovers	Musician	Named after her song "All the Lovers".	
Kyoko Saito	Kyonkois	Musician		
=== L ===
Lady Gaga	Little Monsters	Musician		
Lady Leshurr	Shurrporters	Musician		
Lali Espósito	Lalitos	Musician	"Lalitos" is the neutral name. For only girls, it's "Lalitas"	
Latto	Jackpots	Musician		
Leigh-Anne	Legion	Musician		
Lauren Jauregui	The Coven	Musician	Formerly "Jaguars"	
Laufey	Lauvers	Musician		
Led Zeppelin	Zepheads	Music group		
Lego	AFOLs	Toy	Used for adult fans only; the acronym stands for Adult Fans of Lego	
Le Sserafim	Fearnot	Music group		
Lewis Capaldi	Big Fat Sexy Jungle Cats	Musician		
Liam Payne	Payno's	Musician		
Lil Wayne	Wayniacs	Musician		
Lilly Singh	Team Super	YouTuber	Also occasionally referred to as "Unicorns".	
Lindsey Stirling	Stirlingites	Musician		
Linkin Park	Soldiers	Music group		
Lisa	Lilies	Musician		
Little Mix	Mixers	Music group		
Live	Freaks4Live	Music group		
Liverpool F.C.	Kopites	Sports team	Name based on The Kop, one of the stands in Anfield, which in turn was named after the Battle of Spion Kop	
Lizzo	Lizzbians	Musician		
Lngshot	Shotties	Music group		
Loona	Orbit	Music group		
Logic	RattPack, Bobbysoxers	Musician		
Lost	Losties	TV show		
Louis Tomlinson	Louies	Musician		
Lucifer	Lucifans	TV show	The show itself acknowledged the fandom name by having the titular character refer to his in-universe fans using the same name in an almost fourth-wall-breaking comment in Season 03 Episode 02.	
Lucy	Wal wal	Music group	The sound of a puppy barking, this continues the theme they began by naming their band after a dog.	
Luke Black	Lobsters, Lobsties	Musician		
=== M ===
Mabel	Hunnies	Musician		
Machine Head	Head Cases	Music group		
Madonna	Madonna wannabes, Rebel Hearts	Musician	Commonly associated with females from the Madonna fandom.	
Mamamoo	Moomoo	Music group		
Maren Morris	Lunatics	Musician	Previously called "Heroes" based on Morris' debut album Hero. It was modified after conservative commentator Tucker Carlson insulted Morris on national television, calling her a "Lunatic Country Music Person" for standing up for the Trans community. Morris and her fans reclaimed the term, changing their fandom name into "Lunatics".	
Mariah Carey	Lambs	Musician		
Marina Diamandis	Diamonds	Musician		
Matt Walsh	Sweet Baby Gang	Podcaster	Taken from a clip played during his podcast in which a woman pleads to her "sweet babies" to dress better on airplanes	
MattyBRaps	BBoys & BGirls	Musician		
The Maze Runner	Gladers	Book		
Me:I	You:Me	Music group		
Megadeth	Droogies	Music group	Taken from the movie A Clockwork Orange	
Megan Thee Stallion	Hotties	Musician		
Meghan Trainor	Megatronz	Musician		
Melanie Martinez	Little Bows; Chicken nuggets Crybabies; Cherubs; Angel bbies Earthlings	Musician	Crybabies is named after her 2015 debut album Cry Baby	
MEOVV	PAWMPAWM	Music group	Combination of the words pomme ("apple" in French) and "paw"	
Mercedes Moné	The Krew	Wrestler		
Meryl Streep	Streepers	Actress		
The Meteors	Wrecking Crew	Music group		
Michael Jackson	Moonwalkers	Musician	Named after Jackson's signature dance move the Moonwalk.	
Middle-Earth	Ringers	Book	Also known as "Tolkienites".	
MIKA	Mikafreaks	Musician		
Miley Cyrus	Smilers	Musician	Named after Cyrus's childhood nickname "Smiley"	
Minnesota United FC	Wonderwall	Sports team	Refers to the song "Wonderwall" by British rock band Oasis, as well as the name of the supporters' section and the main group for all supporters' groups. The song is sung at home games that Minnesota United wins.	
Monsta X	Monbebe	Music group	It is derived from a French word meaning "my baby".	
Morissette	Mowienatics	Musician	The name is derived from "Mowie," Morissette's nickname used by those who are close friends with her.	
Mother Mother	Fam Fam	Music group	Inspired by the band's song "Family"	
Motörhead	Motörheadbangers	Music group		
Muse	Musers	Music group		
My Chemical Romance	Killjoys, MCRmy	Music group	Named after the titular group from the plot of their fourth studio album, Danger Days: The True Lives of the Fabulous Killjoys as well as the band's Killjoy personas they took on for the album's promotional material and tour.	
My Little Pony: Friendship Is Magic	Bronies, pegasisters	TV show		
Mystery Science Theater 3000	MSTies	TV show		
=== N ===
NCT	NCTzens	Music group		
NMIXX	NSWER	Music group		
The Neighbourhood	Hoodlums	Music group		
Neil Diamond	Diamond Heads	Musician		
Neil Young	Rusties	Musician	Named after the album Rust Never Sleeps	
Neon Genesis Evangelion	Evageeks	Anime / Manga		
NewJeans	Bunnies	Music group		
New Kids on the Block	Blockheads	Music group		
New Model Army	The Family	Music group		
New Orleans Saints	Big Easy Mafia, Who Dat Nation	Sports team	Also the Official Fan Club of the New Orleans Saints	
New York Rangers	Rangerstown	Sports team		
Newcastle United F.C.	Toon Army	Sports team	The name comes from the Geordie pronunciation of the word town	
Newport County A.F.C.	Amber Army	Sports team		
Neymar	Neymarzetes	Athlete		
Niall Horan	Lovers	Musician		
Nicki Minaj	Barbz	Musician	Male fans are called "Ken Barbz". "Barbz" is derived from Minaj's frequent referral to herself as Barbie.	
Nikocado Avocado	Peasants, Ashleys, Little Sloths	YouTuber	Peasants and Ashleys were used interchangeably throughout most of his mukbanging career. Little Sloths was used in his earlier videos until being replaced by the former two.	
Nine Inch Nails	Pigs	Music group	As referred to by Trent Reznor. Named after the songs "Piggy" and "March of the Pigs."	
Nine Muses	Mine	Music group		
No Na	Orchids	Music group		
Nora Aunor	Noranians	Actress	The name was coined by entertainment journalists due to the fanbase's dedication to Nora Aunor.	
Normani	The Nation	Musician	Shortened version of "Kordeination"	
Northern Ireland national football team	Green and White Army	Sports team		
Nothingface	The Sick	Music group		
Nova Twins	Discord Crew	Music group	The band's fanbase have also called themselves "Supernovas" or "Nova Family".	
Novulent	Novas	Musician		
Number i	iLYs	Music group	it stands for "i-LOVE-YOU(s)", pronounced as "ai-liːs"	
=== O ===
The Office	Dunderheads	TV show		
Olivia Rodrigo	Livies	Musician	Some fans also call themselves "Olives" or "Rodrighoes".	
Olly Murs	Murs Army	Musician		
One Chicago	ChiHards	TV show	coined by fans and used by the official account/its stars	
One Direction	Directioners	Music group		
The Ordinary Boys	Ordinary Army	Music group		
Otep	Shadow Soldiers	Music group	Chosen by poll on the band's website.	
Our Flag Means Death	The Crew	TV show	Coined by show creator David Jenkins.	
=== P ===
P1Harmony	P1ece	Music group		
Palaye Royale	Soldiers of the Royal Council	Music group		
Paramore	Parafamily, Ankle Biters	Music group	The latter comes from their song "Anklebiters".	
Pentagon	Universe	Music group	The group explained it means "you're my universe," a line from their song "Pentagon" on their first mini album.	
Perawat Sangpotirat & Prachaya Ruangroj	Peraya	Actor	A portmanteau of their first names	
Perrie Edwards	Auras	Musician		
Pet Shop Boys	Petheads	Music group		
The Phantom of the Opera	Phans	Book		
Phish	Phishheads	Musician		
Phoebe Bridgers	Pharbs	Musician		
Pia Wurtzbach	Pianatics	Model		
Pixey	Pixies	Musician		
Pixie Lott	Crazy Cats	Musician		
Poe	Angry-Psychos	Musician		
Porcelain Black	Trainwrecks	Musician		
Poppy	Poppy Seeds	Musician		
ppcocaine	Trap Bunnies	Musician	Named after the rapper's former stage name, Trap Bunnie Bubbles	
Press Hit Play	Pearls	Music group		
Psych	Psych-Os	TV show		
=== Q ===
Qveen Herby	Qveendom, Qveen Scouts	Musician		
=== R ===
Rachel Chinouriri	Darlings	Musician		
Rangers F.C.	Bluenoses	Sports team		
RBD	RBDManiacos	Music group		
Real Madrid C.F.	Madridistas	Sports team		
Red Dwarf	Dwarfers	TV show		
Red Rising	Howlers	Book		
Red Velvet	ReVeluv	Music group	Often referring in short as "Luvies"	
Remi Wolf	RemJobs	Musician		
Reneé Rapp	Young Ex-Wives	Musician	Reference to her song "Colorado"	
Rescene	REMINE	Music group	'REMINE' is an altered form of the word 'REMIND' meaning being reminded of a scene through scent referring to the group's meaning for the words 'RESCENE' and 'MINE' together that RESCENE is "my eternal scent and scene that I will never forget".	
Rick and Morty	Schwiftites	TV show	Term "schwifty" originated from a song within an episode.	
Ricky Martin	Sexy Souls	Musician		
Rico Nasty	Nasty Mob	Musician		
Rihanna	Rihanna Navy	Musician		
Rina Sawayama	Pixels	Musician		
Rita Ora	Ritabots	Musician		
RizBar	RizBaristan	Sports duo		
RM	RMysts	Musician		
The Room	Roomies	Film		
Rosalía	Ángeles	Musician		
Rosé	Number Ones	Musician		
Ruel	Ruelettes	Musician		
Rush	Rushians	Music group		
=== S ===
Saiko	Saiko adictos	Music group		
Sailor Moon	Moonies	Anime / Manga	Not to be confused with Moonies	
Sakura Gakuin	Fukei	Music group	Meaning "parent" or "guardian", following the theme of school life	
Sakurazaka46	Buddies	Music group	Named after a song in their first single	
Salman Khan	Salmaniacs	Actor		
Sam Callahan	Callafans	Musician		
Sam Smith	Little Sailors	Musician		
Sarah Geronimo	Popsters	Musician	Named after Geronimo's nickname "Popstar Royalty"	
Saweetie	Icy Gang	Musician	Named after the rapper's debut single, "Icy Grl"	
Say Now	Saylors	Music Group		
SB19	A'TIN	Music group	Pronounced as eighteen, the P-pop boy group revealed their official fandom name themselves	
Schoolyard Heroes	Skeleton Army	Music group	Named after the band's 2003 song "Bury the Tooth of the Hydra and the Skeleton Army Will Rise".	
Scotland men's national football team	Tartan Army	Sports team		
Scotty McCreery	McCreerians	Musician		
Seattle Seahawks	12s	Sports team		
Selena Gomez	Selenators	Musician		
Seventeen	Carat	Music group	The official fanclub name was revealed at a Seventeen concert.	
Sexyy Red	Hoochie Babies	Musician		
SF9	Fantasy	Music group	Stands for Future, Accompany, Next, Together, Affect, SF9, You	
Shakib Khan	Shakibian	Actor		
Shakira	Shakifans	Musician		
Sharon Cuneta	Sharonians	Musician, Actress		
Shawn Mendes	Mendes Army	Musician		
Sherlock Holmes	Sherlockians	Book		
SHINee	Shawols	Music group	SHINee World abbreviation (샤이니월드; syaini ueoldeu).	
Sia	Lovers	Musician		
Sistar	Star1	Music group		
Six	The Queendom	Musical		
Skillet	Panheads	Music group		
Slayer	Slaytanic Wehrmacht	Music group		
Slayyyter	Gorgeous Little Nasty Freak Bitches	Musician		
Slipknot	Maggots	Music group		
Sơn Tùng M-TP	Sky	Musician		
Sparkbird	Sparkflock	Musician		
Spiritbox	Boxies	Music group		
Star Trek	Trekkies, Trekkers	TV show		
Star Wars	Warsies	Film	Starwoids was a fandom name promoted by the 2001 documentary Starwoids	
STAYC	Swith	Music group	Pronounced as "Sweet", the name is a combination of the first letter of STAYC and "With", meaning "Together with STAYC" or "I'll be by STAYC's side."	
Stargate	Gaters	Film / TV show		
Stef Sanjati	Breadsquad	YouTuber		
Stefflon Don	Dons	Musician		
Stephen Colbert	Colbert Nation	Comedian		
Stray Kids	Stay	Music group		
Subwoolfer	Subcubs	Music group		
Super Junior	E.L.F	Music group	Short for Everlasting Friends	
Suppasit Jongcheveevat	Mewlions	Musician/actor		
Swansea City A.F.C.	Jacks	Sports team		
SZA	Camp	Musician	Also called "Camp Ctrl"	
=== T ===
T-ARA	Queens	Music group		
Take That	Thatters	Music group		
Tamar Braxton	Tamartians	Musician		
Tate McRae	Tater-Tots	Musician		
Tawan Vihokratana & Thitipoom Techaapaikhun	Polca	Actor	A portmanteau of two animals polar bear and orca, associated to the Thai actors respectively.	
Taylor Swift	Swifties	Musician	Some fans also call themselves "Swiffers"	
Tempest	iE	Music group		
Tems	Rebel Gang	Musician		
TINI	Tinistas	Musician		
Texas A&M	12th Man	Sports team		
The9	NINECHO	Music group		
The Price Is Right	Loyal Friends and True	TV show	Coined by original host Bob Barker to identify long time fans.	
theSTART	The Society of Modern-Day Heretics	Music group		
Thirty Seconds to Mars	Echelon, The Cult	Music group		
Thomas Sanders	Fanders	Actor / Singer / YouTuber	On the early days of his career on Vine, some called themselves "Sanderlings" and some "Foster Children" for his former username "Foster Dawg"	
Timothée Chalamet	Chalamaniacs	Actor		
Tinashe	SweeTees	Musician		
Tkay Maidza	Grasshoppers	Musician	Named after the rapper's 2020 song "Grasshopper"	
Tokio Hotel	Aliens	Music group		
Tom Hiddleston	Hiddlestoners	Actor		
Toni Braxton	Toni Tigers	Musician		
Tori Amos	Toriphiles	Musician		
Travis Scott	Ragers	Musician		
Trey Songz	Angels	Musician		
Tri.be	TRUE	Music group	The name takes the 'TR' from the group's name, the 'U' from the word 'Us,' and 'E' from the word 'Forever' to encompass the girl group's wishes to be with their fans forever.	
True Blood	Truebies	TV show		
TVXQ	Cassiopeia	Music group		
Twenty One Pilots	Skeleton Clique, Clikkies	Music group		
Twice	Once	Music group		
Twilight	Twihards	Book	There are also factions Team Edward and Team Jacob, depending on which character the fans identify with.	
Twisted Method	Cape Coma Inmates	Music group	Named after the band's debut album Escape from Cape Coma. Also known as just Inmates.	
Twisted Sister	S.M.F.F.O.T.S.	Music group	Short for Sick Motherfucking Friends Of Twisted Sister	
TXT	M.O.A	Music group	M.O.A is an acronym for Moment Of Alwaysness	
Tyla	Tygers	Musician		
=== U ===
Uggie	Uggie Huggers	Dog		
U-KISS	Kiss Me	Music group	Also known as KISSME, KISS-ME, and as other stylizations	
Ungu	Cliquers	Music group		
Union J	JCats	Music group		
UP10TION	HONEY10	Music group		
Uriah Heep	Heepsters	Music group		
=== V ===
Vachirawit Chivaaree	Brights	Actor, Singer, Host, Model		
Vachirawit Chivaaree and Metawin Opas-iamkajorn	BrightWin	Actor	A portmanteau of their nicknames from 2gether and Still 2gether	
Valley	Val Pals	Music group		
The Vamps	Vamily	Music group	Other names are Vampettes and Vampions.	
Van Morrison	Vanatics	Musician		
Vice Ganda	Little Ponies	Comedian		
Victon	Alice	Music group		
Victoria Monet	Tribe	Musician		
Vilma Santos	Vilmanians	Actress		
Vintage Trouble	Troublemakers	Music group		
Vlogbrothers	Nerdfighters	YouTubers		
Viviz	Na.V	Music group		
=== W ===
Wake Up to Wogan	TOGs	Radio show	"Terry's Old Geezers/Gals", coined by host Terry Wogan	
Wales national football team	Red Wall	Sports team	See also Wales bucket hat	
Waterparks	Parxies	Music Group		
The Warning (band)	The Warning Army	Music group	In tribute to the Kiss Army	
WayV	WayZenNi	Music group		
Weeekly	Daileee	Music group		
"Weird Al" Yankovic	Close Personal Friends of Al	Musician		
The Weeknd	XO	Musician	Named after The Weeknd's record label	
Wellington Phoenix FC	Yellow Fever	Sports team	Named after the predominant colour of the teams playing strip	
Wet Leg	Wet Wipes, Wet Legends	Music group		
The White Stripes	Candy Cane Children	Music group		
The Who	Wholigans	Music group		
Whitney Houston	Nippians	Musician		
Winner	InnerCircle	Music group		
Winter Soldier	Winter's Children	Comics / Film	Alternative: Children of the Winter	
Wisp	Wispers	Musician		
Wiz Khalifa	Taylors	Musician	Named after Khalifa's favourite shoes, Chuck Taylor All-Stars	
Wooah	Wow	Music group		
Wonho	Wenee	Musician	Stands for "We Are New Ending" or "we need"	
=== X ===
The X-Files	X-Philes	TV show		
Xena: Warrior Princess	Xenites, Hard-Core Nutballs (HCNBs)	TV show		
Xdinary Heroes	Villains	Music group		
XG	Alphaz	Music group	Stylized in all caps.	
XLOV	EVOL	Music group	Love spelled backwards	
xQc	Juicers	Streamer		
X:IN	READYs	Music group	stylized in all caps	
=== Y ===
Yaeji	Onions	Musician		
Yeule	Glitches	Musician	Named after "glitch pop", the sub-genre which the artist is known for	
Yūka Kageyama	Kagesapo	Actress	Abbreviation of "Kageyama Supporter"	
Yungblud	Black Hearts Club	Musician	Fans got matching black heart tattoos on their fingers and then called themselves the black hearts club	
Yuzuru Hanyu	Fanyus	Figure skater		
=== Z ===
Zara Larsson	Zluts	Musician		
Zayn Malik	Zquad	Musician		
Zendaya	Zswaggers	Actress		
Zerobaseone	ZEROSE	Music group		

== See also ==
- Honorific nicknames in popular music
