= Hey Sexy Lady =

2002 single by Shaggy

Single by Shaggy featuring Brian and Tony Gold

from the album Lucky Day
- Released: 3 September 2002
- Genre: Reggae; dancehall; tango
- Length: 3:19
- Label: MCA
- Songwriters: Christopher Birch; Orville Burrell; Rickadoo George Ducent; Robert McDonald Livingston; Brian Gold (Brian Derek Thompson); Tony Gold (Patrick Morrison)
- Producer: Christopher Birch

Shaggy singles chronology
"Me Julie" (2002)	"Hey Sexy Lady" (2002)	"Strength of a Woman" (2003)

"Hey Sexy Lady" is a song recorded by Jamaican-American reggae recording artist Shaggy featuring Brian and Tony Gold. It utilizes the Sexy Lady Explosion riddim with additional beats. It was written by Shaggy, Christopher Birch, Rickadoo George Ducent, Robert Livingston, Brian Gold, and Tony Gold, and produced by Birch. The track was released on 3 September 2002, to CHR/Pop, CHR/Rhythmic, and urban contemporary radio formats as the lead single to his sixth studio album Lucky Day (2002) via MCA Records. The track became a top ten hit in Australia and multiple countries in Europe, but failed to chart on the US Billboard Hot 100 and had very minor success on Billboard's component charts. As of August 2014, it was the 110th best-selling single of the 21st century in France, with 287,000 units sold.

== Critical reception ==
Chuck Taylor, of Billboard magazine, responded negatively of the track, describing it as a "surprisingly audacious step backward" for Shaggy. He criticized the chorus as relentless and disliked Shaggy's off-key ad-libbing. Taylor named it as one of the laziest singles of the year and called it a "wholly unpleasant assault on the ears."

== Versions of the song and track listing ==
Originally, the album has two versions of the song. The Album Version and the "Org. Sting Intl. Mix" version featuring dancehall artist Sean Paul and Will Smith. A collection of song versions is also found together on a separate EP. One can be found on the Yahoo!'s LAUNCHcast with the instrumentals.

- Original Version (feat. Brian and Tony Gold)
- Garage Repaired Mix(by Romain Tranchart and Play Paul)
- Org. Sting Intl Mix (feat. Brian and Tony Gold and Sean Paul)
- Dancehall Version (feat. Brian and Tony Gold and Sean Paul)
  - Uses the original Sexy Lady Explosion riddim
- Put It On Me Just Blaze Remix (feat. Brian and Tony Gold)
  - Remix by Just Blaze
- Riddim Driven Remix (feat. Brian and Tony Gold, Sean Paul, and Will Smith)
  - Two versions of the remix exists:
- a new verse by Shaggy with an alternative beat
- the original verse by Shaggy with a beatbox before Will Smith's verse
- Spanish Fly Radio (feat. Brian and Tony Gold)
  - Used as the single mix in some territories. A re-edited video also exists for this version

== In popular culture ==
Robert Bassam, founder and CEO of Easterns Automotive Group, made a commercial for his dealerships called Eastern Motors, based in the DMV area, which used an instrumental version of the song featuring athletes and celebrities such as: LaVar Arrington, Brendan Haywood, Clinton Portis, and Carmelo Anthony.

== Charts ==
=== Weekly charts ===
Weekly chart performance for "Hey Sexy Lady"
Chart (2002–03)	Peak position
Australia (ARIA)	4
Australian Urban (ARIA)	3
Austria (Ö3 Austria Top 40)	9
Belgium (Ultratop 50 Flanders)	3
Belgium (Ultratop 50 Wallonia)	6
Canada (Nielsen SoundScan)	4
Europe (Eurochart Hot 100 Singles)	14
European Dance Radio (Music & Media)	24
European Radio (Music & Media)	29
France (SNEP)	5
Germany (GfK)	10
Hungary (Editors' Choice Top 40)	28
Ireland (IRMA)	18
Italy (FIMI)	7
Italy Airplay (Music & Media)	4
Netherlands (Dutch Top 40)	3
Netherlands (Single Top 100)	4
New Zealand (Recorded Music NZ)	29
Portugal (AFP)	3
Sweden (Sverigetopplistan)	14
Switzerland (Schweizer Hitparade)	18
UK Singles (Official Charts)	10
US Hot R&B/Hip-Hop Singles Sales (Billboard)	37
US Hot R&B/Hip-Hop Songs (Billboard)	97
US Hot Singles Sales (Billboard)	59
US Rhythmic Airplay (Billboard)	33
US CHR/Pop (Radio & Records)	50
US CHR/Rhythmic (Radio & Records)	38

=== Year-end charts ===
Year-end chart performance for "Hey Sexy Lady"
Chart (2002)	Position
Australia (ARIA)	81
Canada (Nielsen SoundScan)	10
Netherlands (Dutch Top 40)	65
UK Singles (OCC)	188

Chart (2003)	Position
Australia (ARIA)	22
Austria (Ö3 Austria Top 40)	70
Belgium (Ultratop Flanders)	81
France (SNEP)	19
Netherlands (Dutch Top 40)	75
Netherlands (Single Top 100)	65

== Release history ==
Release dates and format(s) for "Hey Sexy Lady"
Region	Date	Format(s)	Label(s)	Ref.
United States	3 September 2002	Contemporary hit; rhythmic contemporary; urban contemporary radio	MCA	
Europe	21 October 2002	—N/a	MCA	
United Kingdom	4 November 2002	CD; cassette single	MCA; Universal Island	
Australia	14 November 2002	CD single	MCA	

== Certifications ==
Region	Certification	Certified units/sales
Australia (ARIA)	Platinum	70,000^{^}
Belgium (BRMA)	Gold	25,000^{*}
Canada (Music Canada) physical	Platinum	10,000^{^}
New Zealand (RMNZ)	Platinum	30,000^{‡}
^{*} Sales figures based on certification alone.^{^} Shipments figures based on certification alone.^{‡} Sales+streaming figures based on certification alone.
