= James Fifield =

James Fifield is the name of:

- James W. Fifield Jr. (1899–1977), American Congregational minister
- Jim Fifield (James G. Fifield), American businessman, president and CEO of EMI 1988–1998
