= Get My Party On =

Single by Shaggy

from the album Lucky Day
- Released: 7 July 2003
- Length: 4:42
- Label: MCA
- Songwriter(s): Orville Burrell; Dave Kelly; Christopher Birch; Ricardo Ducent
- Producer(s): Christopher Birch

Shaggy singles chronology
| "Strength of a Woman" (2003) | "Get My Party On" (2003) | "Wild 2nite" (2005) |

"Get My Party On" is a song recorded by Jamaican American reggae artist Shaggy. It was written by him alongside Dave Kelly, Ricardo Ducent and Christopher Birch for his sixth studio album Lucky Day (2002), with Birch producing the song and Chaka Khan having featured vocals. The song was released as the album's third and final single on 7 July 2003 solely in mainland Europe and Australia. It became a top twenty hit in Germany.

== Track listing ==
German maxi single
| No. | Title | Producer(s) | Length |
|---|---|---|---|
| 1. | "Get My Party On" (German Radio Mix) | Christopher Birch; Marek Pompetzki^{[a]}; Nico Zeh^{[a]} | 3:44 |
| 2. | "Get My Party On" (Album Version) | Birch | 4:43 |
| 3. | "Get My Party On" (Numarek Mix) | Birch; Numarek^{[a]}; Pompetzki^{[b]}; Zeh^{[b]} | 5:25 |
| 4. | "Get My Party On" (Graham Stack Remix) | Birch; Graham Stack^{[a]} | 3:32 |
| 5. | "Get My Party On" (Full Phatt Remix) | Birch; Matt Ward^{[a]} | 4:12 |

Notes

- ^{^[a]} denotes remix producer
- ^{^[b]} denotes additional remix producer

== Charts ==
| Chart (2003) | Peak position |
|---|---|
| Australia (ARIA) | 41 |
| Austria (Ö3 Austria Top 40) | 26 |
| France (SNEP) | 26 |
| Germany (GfK) | 20 |
| Hungary (Dance Top 40) | 17 |
| Hungary (Editors' Choice Top 40) | 18 |
| Italy (FIMI) | 39 |
| Switzerland (Schweizer Hitparade) | 33 |
