= Mariner High School (Cape Coral, Florida) =

Coordinates: 26.665°N 82.005°W

- 701 Chiquita Blvd N. Cape Coral, Florida; United States

Information
- Type: Public Secondary
- Established: 1987, 39 years ago
- School district: Lee County
- Principal: Thomas Michel
- Staff: 24.38
- Faculty: 77.70 (FTE)
- Grades: 9–12
- Enrollment: 1,894 (2023-2024)
- Colors: Silver & Black
- Mascot: Triton
- Nickname: Fighting Tritons
- Rivals: Cape Coral
- Information: (239) 772-3324
- Website: mrh.leeschools.net

Mariner High School is located in Cape Coral, Florida in the Lee County School District and is home to the Fightin' Tritons. The school is located at 701 Chiquita Boulevard North and serves students from Cape Coral, the neighboring villages on Pine Island, and North Fort Myers. The school opened 39 years ago for the 1987–1988 school year at its current location, and its enrollment in May 2014 was 1,485 students.

== Math, Science, and Technology ==
Mariner High School started a special math, science, and technology,(or MST) section of the school at the beginning of the 2008–2009 school year. The program allows gifted students to join a rigorous academic program, and provide academic improvement opportunities.

== Rivals ==
Mariner High School and Cape Coral High School were the first two high schools in Cape Coral and have a long-standing rivalry.

== Mariner Sports ==
Mariner High School offers a variety of athletic programs for students during the fall, winter and spring. Sports offered include:

- Baseball
- Basketball
- Bowling
- Cheerleading
- Cross Country
- Football
- Golf
- Soccer
- Softball
- Swimming & Diving
- Tennis
- Track & Field
- Volleyball
- Wrestling
- Marching Band

== Notable alumni ==
- Niko Price - Professional Mixed Martial Artist for the UFC
- Alex Freeland - MLB baseball shortstop for the Los Angeles Dodgers organization
- Earnest Graham - NFL running back for the Tampa Bay Buccaneers; his MHS jersey is retired. Current Head Coach of Evangelical Christian School (Fort Myers, Florida)
- Greg Spires - NFL defensive end with the Tampa Bay Buccaneers, Cleveland Browns, and New England Patriots.
- Casey Coleman - MLB pitcher with the Chicago Cubs and Kansas City Royals.
- Pat Burke - NBA center with the Orlando Magic and the Phoenix Suns
- Mike Zunino - MLB catcher with the Tampa Bay Rays
- Seth Petruzelli - competed on The Ultimate Fighter 2, retired professional Mixed Martial Artist
- Derrick Tribbett - musician, member of Twisted Method
