= Lucky Day (album) =

Studio album by Shaggy
- Released: 29 October 2002
- Recorded: 2002
- Genres: Dancehall, reggae fusion
- Length: 55:12
- Label: MCA
- Producer: O. Burrell

Shaggy chronology
Hot Shot (2000)	Lucky Day (2002)	Clothes Drop (2005)

Singles from Lucky Day
- 1. "Hey Sexy Lady" Released: 3 September 2002; 2. "Strength of a Woman" Released: 14 October 2002; 3. "Get My Party On" Released: 2003

Lucky Day is the sixth studio album released by Jamaican singer Shaggy. It was released on October 29, 2002. The album peaked at number 24 on the Billboard 200 and later reached Gold certification. Three singles were released from the album: "Hey Sexy Lady", "Strength of a Woman" and "Get My Party On". The album featured guest appearances from Shaggy's longtime collaborators Brian and Tony Gold, as well as a guest appearance from Chaka Khan. The song "We Are the Ones" was included on the album Barbie Mix, which was released to promote the My Scene dolls.

MCA Records hoped that Lucky Day could stop a slump in sales at the label for 2002. While the album was a moderate commercial success (selling 352,000 copies by July 2005), it did not sell as well as hoped, resulting in MCA's president, Jay Boberg, resigning from his position at the label in January 2003, and ultimately led to MCA being merged into Geffen Records in June 2003.

== Critical reception ==
Professional ratings
Aggregate scores
Source	Rating
Metacritic	62/100
Review scores
Source	Rating
AllMusic	3/5 stars
Entertainment Weekly	B
The Guardian	3/5 stars
New York Post	3/4 stars
Now	3/5 Ns
Q	3/5 stars
Robert Christgau	(dud)
Rolling Stone	3/5 stars
USA Today	3/4 stars
Yahoo! Music UK	2/10 stars

Lucky Day received mixed reviews from critics. At Metacritic, which assigns a normalized rating out of 62 to reviews from mainstream critics, the album has an average score of 62 based on seven reviews. AllMusic editor Alex Henderson wrote that although Lucky Day was "not quite in a class with Hot Shot," it remained "an enjoyable follow-up" full of "congenial, good-natured crossover dancehall," offering "infectious ditties" and some surprises, ultimately making it "a rewarding effort that takes its share of chances." Billboard found that the album was "an at times cheesy, but overall enjoyable affair," with a "lackluster" lead single "Hey Sexy Lady," but stronger moments when he returned to dancehall roots, and "Strength of a Woman" standing out as an "anthemic" highlight. Similarly, USA Today's Steve Jones wrote that Lucky Day "may be a bit too pop- and R&B-infused for reggae purists," but was "jammed full of pulsating rhythms and sensual grooves." The Guardian's Dave Simpson felt that Lucky Day was "14 lovingly crafted dub-pop shagging sonnets" that balanced Shaggy's "preposterous but irresistible" style with surprisingly "feminist" themes, ultimately showing a shift toward "bigger things" while still returning to form.

Writing for The Village Voice, Elena Oumano noted thath Lucky Day was sticking to proven dancehall formulas and “not about transforming the human condition,” but about maintaining his entertaining "Mr. Lover Lover" persona. Elizabeth Bromstein wrote that Lucky Day "stays a little more on the low side of the Shaggy highs-and-lows meter. Centred around women, in all our glory, it’s an overproduced reggae/R&B collection — even Chaka Khan's guest appearance is lacklustre. But some of it’s kind of fun, and you can’t help but feel the goodnaturedness shine through. Gavin Edwards from Rolling Stone wrote that Shaggy's faster songs worked best, as his music "gets better" at higher tempos, with highlights like "Hey Sexy Lady" and "Hookie Jookie," though overall the album had a "wide range of quality." Cheo Tyehimba from Entertainment Weekly called Lucky Day "another crop of dance tracks for the masses," while People concluded that Shaggy "was still at his best when at his baddest" on Lucky Day.

== Track listing ==
No.	Title	Writer(s)	Producer(s)	Length
1.	"Shake Shake Shake"	Orville Burrell; Michael Fletcher; Ricardo "Rik Rok" Ducent	Fletcher	3:25
2.	"Full Control" (featuring Barrington Levy)	Burrell; Levy; Dave Kelly; Ducent	Christopher Birch; Shaun "Sting International" Pizzonia	3:49
3.	"Hookie Jookie"	Burrell; Birch; Ducent; Pizzonia	Pizzonia	3:49
4.	"Hey Sexy Lady" (featuring Brian and Tony Gold)	Burrell; Birch; Ducent; Brian Thompson; Patrick Morrison; Robert Livington	Livington	3:19
5.	"Get My Party On" (featuring Chaka Khan)	Burrell; Birch; Ducent; Kelly	Birch	4:43
6.	"Lucky Day"	Burrell; Armando Colon; Ducent; Kelly	Kelly	3:21
7.	"Strength of a Woman"	Burrell; Birch; Fletcher; Ducent; Robert Browne; Shaun Darson; Pizzonia	Pizzonia	3:49
8.	"Lost" (featuring Prince Mydas)	Burrell; Anthony Hawthorne; Birch; Gordon Dukes; Ducent; Livingston	Livingston	3:29
9.	"Strange Love" (featuring Mona)	Burrell; Birch; Kelly	Birch	3:14
10.	"Leave Me Alone"	Burrell; Colon; Kelly; Ducent; Pizzonia	Pizzonia	3:51
11.	"These Are the Lips" (featuring Rikrok)	Burrell; Colon; Ducent; Pizzonia	Colon	3:30
12.	"Give Thanks"	Burrell; Kent Bryan; Ducent	Bryan	3:46
13.	"Walking in My Shoes"	Burrell; Bryan; Ducent; Philip Smart	Pizzonia; Smart^{[a]}	2:52
14.	"We Are the Ones"	Burrell; Colon; Kelly; Fletcher; Ducent; Pizzonia	Pizzonia	4:33
15.	"Hey Sexy Lady" (Original Sting International Mix) (featuring Sean Paul)	Burrell; Birch; Ducent; Thompson; Morrison; Livington; Paul	Livington; Pizzonia^{[b]}	3:57

US bonus track
No.	Title	Writer(s)	Producer(s)	Length
16.	"Strength of a Woman" (Graham Stack Remix Radio Edit)	Burrell; Birch; Fletcher; Ducent; Browne; Darson; Pizzonia	Pizzonia; Graham Stack^{[b]}	3:30

UK bonus tracks
No.	Title	Length
16.	"High Beam"	3:34
17.	"Hey Sexy Lady" (Video)

Notes

- ^{^[a]} signifies co-producer
- ^{^[b]} signifies remix producer

== Charts ==
=== Weekly charts ===
Weekly chart performance for Lucky Day
Chart (2002)	Peak position
Australian Albums (ARIA)	75
Austrian Albums (Ö3 Austria)	20
Canadian Albums (Billboard)	5
Canadian R&B Albums (Nielsen SoundScan)	7
Dutch Albums (Album Top 100)	46
French Albums (SNEP)	53
German Albums (Offizielle Top 100)	35
Italian Albums (FIMI)	47
New Zealand Albums (RMNZ)	38
Swiss Albums (Schweizer Hitparade)	38
UK Albums (Official Charts)	54
US Billboard 200	24

=== Year-end charts ===
Year-end chart performance for Lucky Day
Chart (2002)	Position
Canadian Albums (Nielsen SoundScan)	70

== Certifications and sales ==
Region	Certification	Certified units/sales
Canada (Music Canada)	Platinum	100,000^{^}
United States (RIAA)	Gold	352,000
^{^} Shipments figures based on certification alone.
