= Richard Palmese =

American music industry executive (born 1947)

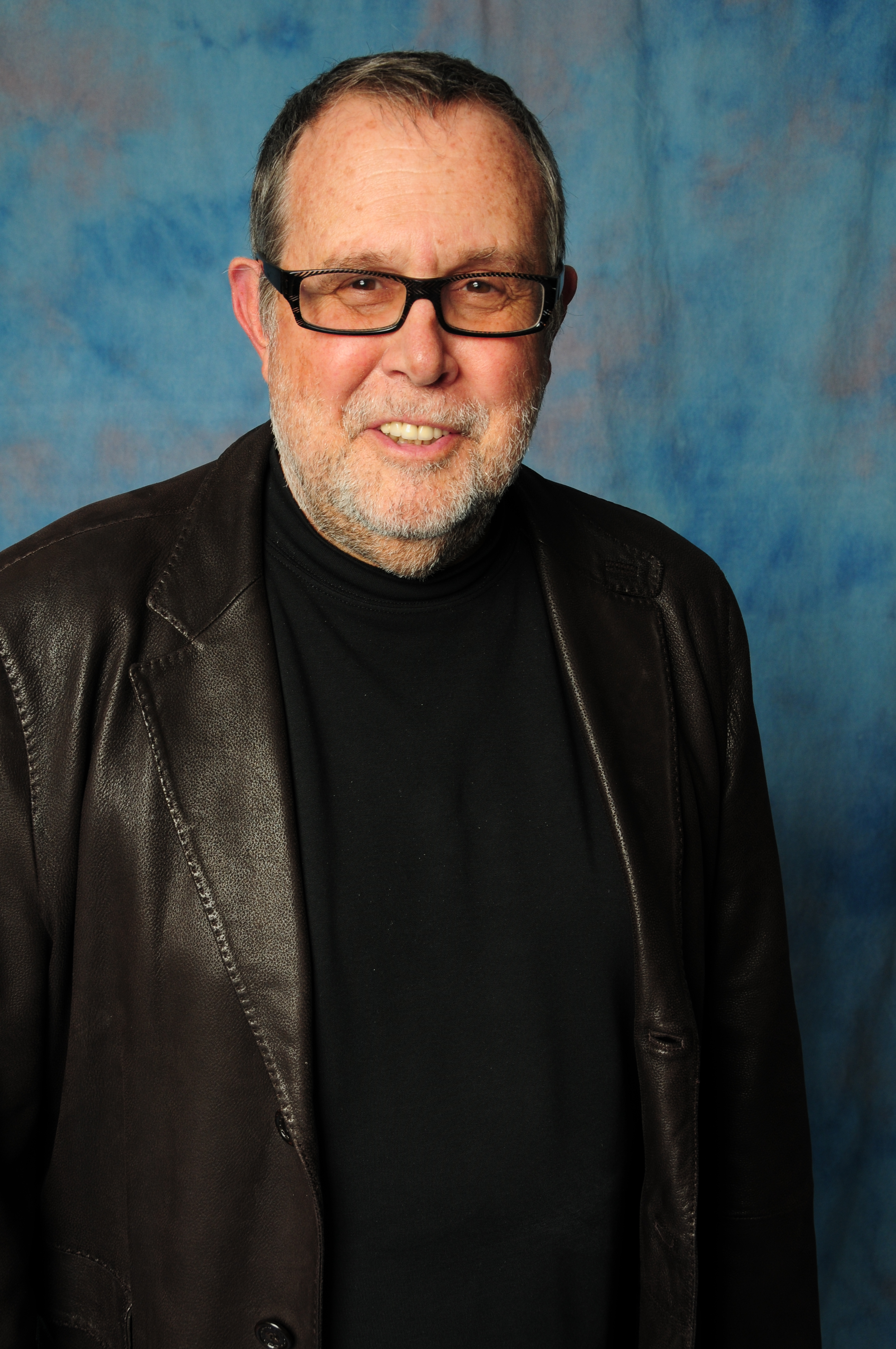
Richard Palmese

Richard Palmese (born October 21, 1947) is an American music industry executive.

== Career ==
Palmese was born in Brooklyn, New York and grew up in Astoria, Queens. He studied for the priesthood at Montfort Seminary in Bay Shore, New York and attended St. Louis University where he discovered his new vocation, music. His career kicked off as the morning disc jockey at St. Louis’ underground progressive radio station, KSHE, which brought him to the attention of Clive Davis, who hired Palmese at Arista Records (1975–1983), where he eventually became Senior Vice President of Promotion. In 1983, Irving Azoff hired Palmese as Executive Vice President of marketing and promotion for MCA Records in Los Angeles. In 1990, he was named president of the label, a post he held until MCA Records was sold to Seagram Company Ltd in 1995.

Palmese subsequently rejoined Clive Davis at Arista Records as the Senior VP of Promotion. In 2000, Palmese was named Executive VP of Promotion for the newly formed J Records. In 2002, he was promoted to Senior Executive VP of Promotion of RCA Records, overseeing Arista Records, J Records, and RCA Records.

In late 2011, Palmese retired from RCA Records/Sony Music to once again work for Irving Azoff, this time at Front Line Management group as a promotion consultant. At the same time he formed his own company under the Azoff umbrella, Palmese Entertainment, where he marketed and promoted new unsigned artists as well as consulted major labels.

During Palmese's many years in the music business, he has been involved in the career development of artists including Whitney Houston, Alicia Keys, Christina Aguilera, Kelly Clarkson, Carlos Santana, Barry Manilow, Elton John, Aretha Franklin, Patti LaBelle, B. B. King, Outkast, Usher, Rod Stewart, Sarah McLachlan, Dave Matthews Band, Sean Combs, Maroon 5, Gavin DeGraw, Luther Vandross, Notorious B.I.G., Dido, Ke$ha, Kings of Leon, Avril Lavigne, Water, The Lumineers, Capital Cities, The Wanted, Calvin Harris, Armin Van Buuren, Avicii, and A Great Big World.

== Awards and honors ==
In addition to winning music industry awards, Palmese was awarded the City of Hope's “Spirit of Life” award, the highest form of recognition that City of Hope gives to a volunteer, in 2005.

Palmese serves on the board for City of Hope Music and Entertainment Chapter, Musicians on Call, and is a voting member of NARAS.

== Personal life ==
Palmese and his wife, Lana, have two children and one grandson. They reside in Los Angeles, CA.
