= Daisy of Love =

American reality TV dating show

- The cast of Daisy of Love
- Created by: Cris Abrego; Mark Cronin
- Starring: Daisy de la Hoya; Riki Rachtman
- Opening theme: Best of Me
- Composer: Morningwood
- Country of origin: United States
- No. of seasons: 1
- No. of episodes: 12

Production
- Executive producers: Cris Abrego; Mark Cronin; Ben Samek
- Running time: 60 minutes (including commercials)
- Production company: 51 Minds Entertainment

Original release
- Network: VH1
- Release: April 26 – July 26, 2009

Related
- Rock of Love 2 and I Love Money

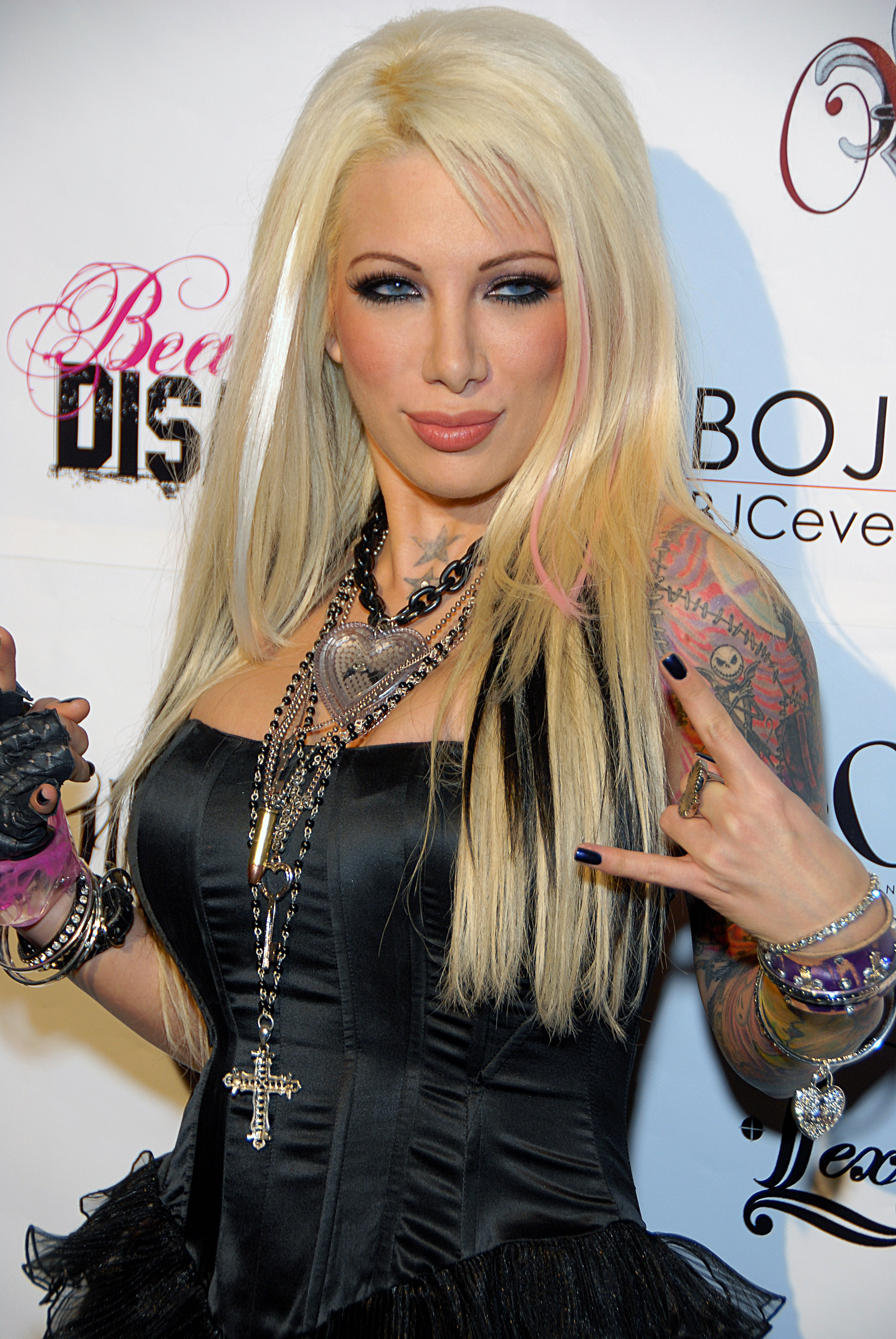
Daisy de la Hoya attending the premiere of VH1's "Daisy of Love" at My House, Hollywood, CA on April 26, 2009

Daisy of Love is an American reality television dating show which stars Daisy de la Hoya, the runner-up of the VH1 reality dating show Rock of Love 2. The show premiered on April 26, 2009, at 9:00 pm ET on VH1.

== Contestants ==
Nickname	Real Name	Age	Hometown	Eliminated
London	Joshua Lee	30	Maryland	Winner^{[b]} episode 4 (withdrew), brought back episode 9
Flex	TJ Markiewicz	22	Ingleside, Illinois	Episode 12 (2nd)
12 Pack (Dave)^{[a]}	David Amerman	26	Wyckoff, New Jersey	Episode 12 (3rd)
Sinister	Derrick Tribbett	24	Peoria, Illinois	Episode 10
Chi Chi	Branden Mathena	29	Villa Park, Illinois	Episode 9
Big Rig	Jeremiah Riggs	26	Vicksburg, Mississippi	Episode 8
Fox	Daniel Alfonso	29	San Mateo, California	Episode 7
6 Gauge	Chris Kummer	29	Palestine, Texas	Episode 6
Cage	Aric Nelson	25	Los Angeles, California	Episode 5 (withdrew)
Tool Box	Miguel Gonzalez	29	Odessa, Texas	Episode 3
Cable Guy	Randall Logan	33	Las Vegas, Nevada	Episode 3
Brooklyn	Christopher Cas	23	Brooklyn, New York	Episode 3 (withdrew)
Professor	Brandon Cabeza	22	Canyon, Texas	Episode 2
Weasel	Pauly Michaelis	36	Bayville, New Jersey	Episode 2
Flipper	Mike Gaboff	22	Clarksburg, New Jersey	Episode 2 (withdrew)
Torch	Kenn Youngar	36	Fort Erie, Ontario	Episode 1
Dropout	Tristan Trouble	22	Corona, California	Episode 1
'86	Nisse "Izzy" Landeberg	25	Sweden	Episode 1
'85	Pelle "Rock" Landeberg	25	Sweden	Episode 1
'84	Calle "Kelii" Landeberg	25	Sweden	Episode 1

^[a]In Episode 7, "12 Pack" asked to be called by his real name, Dave.
^[b]In Episode 4, London withdrew from the competition, but in Episode 9, he was brought back into the competition.

== Elimination order ==
Daisy's Call-out Order
#	Contestants	Episodes											
#	Contestants	1	2	3	4	5	6	7	8	9	10	12	
1	6 Gauge	Fox	Chi Chi	Flex	Cage	6 Gauge	Flex	12 Pack	Flex	London	12 Pack	London	London
2	12 Pack	Flex	London	**Sinister**	Chi Chi	12 Pack	Sinister	Big Rig	12 Pack	12 Pack	London	Flex	Flex
3	'84	6 Gauge	Flex	London	12 Pack	Big Rig	Big Rig	Chi Chi	Sinister	Flex	Flex	12 Pack	
4	'85	Chi Chi	Fox	6 Gauge	Flex	Chi Chi	Chi Chi	Flex	Chi Chi	Sinister	Sinister		
5	'86	Sinister	6 Gauge	12 Pack	Big Rig	Flex	12 Pack	Sinister	Big Rig	Chi Chi			
6	Big Rig	Big Rig	12 Pack	Big Rig	6 Gauge	Fox	Fox	Fox					
7	Brooklyn	Flipper	Cable Guy	Cage	Fox	Sinister	6 Gauge						
8	Cable Guy	12 Pack	Cage	Chi Chi	Sinister	Cage							
9	Cage	Cage	Sinister	Fox	London								
10	Chi Chi	Professor	Big Rig	Tool Box									
11	Dropout	Cable Guy	Tool Box	Cable Guy									
12	Flex	Brooklyn	Brooklyn	Brooklyn									
13	Flipper	Tool Box	Professor										
14	Fox	Weasel	Weasel										
15	London	London	Flipper										
16	Professor	Torch											
17	Sinister	Dropout											
18	Tool Box	'84											
19	Torch	'85											
20	Weasel	'86											

- Contestants in **bold** indicates that they received V.I.P. Access/Passes.

The contestant won the competition.
The contestant went on a solo date with Daisy.
The contestant went on a group date with Daisy.
The contestant was eliminated.
The contestant went on a date with Daisy, but was eliminated.
The contestant went on a date with Daisy, but voluntarily withdrew from the competition.
The contestant was going to receive a chain, but was eliminated.
The contestant voluntarily withdrew from the competition.
The contestant was eliminated outside the house.
The contestant did not receive a chain, but was allowed to stay due to another contestant quitting the competition.
The contestant was supposed to be eliminated, but Daisy decided to keep the contestant.
The contestant was brought back into the competition.

- In episode four, Daisy left the elimination ceremony before distributing all of the chains. 6 Gauge, Fox, and Sinister each did not receive a chain, but was allowed to stay due to London quitting the competition.
- In episode five, there was no elimination. Names are listed in alphabetical order since Daisy informed the guys that Cage has left the competition.
- In episode seven, Daisy eliminated Fox at the beginning of the elimination ceremony and no chains were given out. The remaining contestants are listed in alphabetical order.
- In episode nine, London was brought back into the competition while the rest of the guys went on dates with Daisy.
- Episode 11 was a recap episode.

== Episodes ==
=== Don't Be Stupid ===
First aired April 26, 2009 (2M viewers)

After leaving Mexico with a broken heart, Daisy returns to find a man that is compatible with her. This time she brings Riki Rachtman to help her pluck out the fakes from the real. Although there are 20 men in the show, one of them is very familiar; 12 Pack, who has appeared on I Love New York and I Love Money. The men meet Daisy after she performs a song on stage for them. She says she is building a career for herself as a "singer, model, and all around bad ass". After the show, the men become situated and later, Daisy gives them nicknames to show off their personalities. The men are then led to the "mixer". As all the guys vie for her attention during the mixer, Flipper, who wants to grab the attention of Daisy, decides to jump off the stage bars and into the pool. Daisy confronts Tool Box for saying "Where the bitches at?" and warns him that she will not tolerate that kind of behavior. Weasel, London, and Torch become too intoxicated to form a connection with Daisy. Dropout fails to impress Daisy and she thinks that he is trying too hard to act cool. '84, '85, and '86 tell Daisy that they are only interested in having a good time and dating her together. After the party, Daisy gathers the men together, telling them that she knows who is there for her. She sends the triplets ('84, '85, and '86) packing before the elimination ceremony saying that she thought they were awesome, but that she is serious about finding love and will not share men or be shared by men. Riki invites them to take home with them all the food they can carry. Although the rest of the men think they are safe, Daisy tells them that two more people still have to go. After London and Weasel fall asleep, the guys decide to sabotage Weasel by drawing on his face. They are then gathered in the elimination room as Daisy gives chains one by one to the guys and asks them if they "will stay and be her rockstar". After many chains are passed out, it is soon down to Dropout, London, Torch, and Weasel. She decides to give Weasel and London another chance, and eliminates Torch and Dropout.

- Bottom 4: Dropout, London, Torch, Weasel
- Eliminated: '84, '85, '86, Dropout, Torch
- Elimination Notes:
  - The triplets of the band Snake of Eden ('84, '85, and '86) were eliminated before the elimination ceremony after they revealed that they were basically there just for the free food and liquor, and that they were only interested in dating Daisy together as a set.
  - Dropout was eliminated for being a "Goofball" and seeming too much like a cartoon character.
  - Torch was eliminated because Daisy did not feel a connection, and she could not understand him, especially because "he clicked like a dolphin".

=== True Bromance ===
First aired May 10, 2009

The guys wake up the next morning and as they ready themselves, 12 Pack reads them a letter from "Daisy's Diary" which tells them about their next challenge. The guys are upset about the events concerning Brooklyn and are all very angry that he received a chain. Brooklyn is aware of this and states he will "keep his distance from the other guys". When the guys reach the area of their next challenge, they are surprised to find it takes place in a desert. Ricki tells the guys that today's challenge is all about protecting Daisy. They learn that they must protect a symbolic Daisy mannequin from several sharp-shooting paintballers as they take it from the limo, to the "red carpet", and then to the "stage door". The men are divided into three teams of four and the teams must run their Daisy mannequin from location to location and the team with the least damaged Daisy mannequin will win the challenge and a date with Daisy. The Beige Team goes first with Cage as the first runner. Cage tries to protect the mannequin, but after getting hit so many times with paintballs, he says he begins to black out and the mannequin splits in half. Cage hands it to Brooklyn, who screams and soon hands it off to 6 Gauge. 6 Gauge hands it off to Cable Guy and Cable Guy actually falls on top of the mannequin, crushing many of its parts. The Orange Team goes and Big Rig, Flex, Fox, and Tool Box do a decent job of defending the mannequin. The Black Team defends the mannequin the best so, Sinister, London, Chi Chi and 12 Pack all win a date with Daisy and grants Sinister a VIP date for his good performance. After the challenge, Brooklyn thanks Daisy for his second chance, but says he lied to Daisy because he was drunk and says he is still in love with his ex-girlfriend. He says he is "throwing in the towel". Riki becomes infuriated and accuses Brooklyn of lying and criticizes him for hurting Daisy. Daisy says he was just wasting her time and that she does not need him. Daisy decides to bring all the guys to a club where they can all "let loose". While most of the guys battle for her attention and spend time with her, she forgets Sinister's VIP date, but he says he will let it go because it was the "rockstar thing to do". She also gets angry with Fox because she says that everyone was trying to spend time with her except for him. When confronted about it, Fox told her he does not want to compete with twelve other guys. The next day, Daisy has a romantic art date with 12 Pack, Sinister, Chi Chi, and London, where she paints on their bodies and they paint on her. 12 Pack opens up a lot and talks about his past love life. Sinister connects with Daisy and kisses her, which makes Chi Chi jealous. Chi Chi then kisses Daisy all over her body, which she found creepy. London connects very well with Daisy and she says he could be the one she is looking for. After the date, Cable Guy connects with Daisy and she likes his honesty, but says that he is not aggressive enough for this competition. Flex and Daisy share one-on-one time, and he makes her laugh a lot and Daisy forms a strong connection with him. Toolbox gets drunk and tells the other contestants that he is not "feeling Daisy for shit" and does not have a connection with her, which angers Flex. At elimination, she gives the first chain to Flex, followed by Sinister, London, 6 Gauge, 12 Pack, Big Rig, Cage, Chi Chi, and Fox. She sends home Cable Guy due to his lack of aggression. She was going to give Tool Box the last chain, but is informed by Flex that Tool Box said he did not have a connection with her. Daisy asks Toolbox if he wants to stay, and Tool Box said he wanted to stay, but that it was her decision. Daisy said she did not believe him and decided to eliminate him.

Team leaders	Teams	Team colors	Win / Lose
Cage	6 Gauge, Brooklyn, Cable Guy, Cage	Beige	Lose
Tool Box	Big Rig, Flex, Fox, Tool Box	Orange	Lose
Sinister	12 Pack, Chi Chi, London, Sinister	Black	Win

The team won the challenge and went on a group date with Daisy.
The team lost the challenge.

- Challenge: Paintball Obstacle Course

Beige Team: 6 Gauge, Brooklyn, Cable Guy, Cage
Orange Team: Big Rig, Flex, Fox, Tool Box
Black Team: 12 Pack, Chi Chi, London, Sinister

- Challenge Winners: Black Team
- Quit: Brooklyn
- Bottom 3: Fox, Cable Guy, Tool Box
- Eliminated: Cable Guy, Toolbox
- Elimination notes:
  - Brooklyn withdrew because he still had feelings for his ex-girlfriend.
  - Cable Guy was eliminated because he was not trying hard enough to connect with Daisy.
  - Toolbox was going to receive a chain, but after being informed by Flex that Tool Box said he had no connection with Daisy, Daisy decided to eliminate him.

=== Should I Stay or Should I Go? ===
First aired May 17, 2009

Team Leaders	Teams	Band Name	Assigned Song	Win / Lose
6 Gauge	6 Gauge, Big Rig, Flex	Chip and Daisy	Twinkle, Twinkle Little Star	Lose
London	Cage, Chi Chi, London	The Daisy Blades	Row, Row, Row Your Boat	Win
Sinister	12 Pack, Fox, Sinister	The Daisy Train	Old McDonald Had a Farm	Lose

The contestant won the challenge and went on a group date with Daisy.
The contestant lost the challenge.

- Challenge: Nursery Rhyme Re-write
- Challenge Winners: The Daisy Blades
- Quit: London
- Bottom 3: 6 Gauge, Fox, Sinister
- Eliminated: None
- Elimination Notes:
  - Prior to the elimination ceremony, London was hesitant about whether or not he wanted to remain in the competition because he felt that he and Daisy were "no longer connecting". Daisy informed him that he was going to be given a chain at the elimination ceremony that night, and that she hoped he would accept it. When Daisy offered London his chain, he said he could not accept it because he said he did not want to hurt Daisy.
  - Daisy did not return to the elimination ceremony after she left crying, leaving 6 Gauge, Fox, and Sinister without chains. The episode closes with the elimination ceremony still unfinished.

=== Bring in 'Da Boyz, Bring in 'Da Skunk ===
First aired May 24, 2009

- Challenge: Photoshoot for Daisy's Album Cover

Team 1: 12 Pack, Big Rig, Cage, Chi Chi
Team 2: 6 Gauge, Flex, Sinister, Fox

- Challenge Winners: Team 2
- MVP: Fox
- Quit: Cage
- Elimination Notes:
  - Cage got into a fight with 6 Gauge before the elimination ceremony, and Flex intervened and jumped on Cage to stop him. The episode closes with Daisy asking Cage if he can stay in the house without fighting the other contestants. Cage replies that he cannot promise her that and says it would be best if he went home. Daisy tells him she has to let him go because she does not want the house to be an unsafe environment for any of the contestants.
  - Daisy goes into the elimination room to inform the other contestants that Cage has left the house. Riki tells the contestants that they can leave the elimination ceremony and that they are all safe for that night.

=== Things Are Getting Spicy ===
First aired June 7, 2009

Fight #	Match Up	Winner
1st	Chi Chi vs. Fox	Chi Chi
2nd	12 Pack vs. Big Rig	Big Rig
3rd	6 Gauge vs. Flex	Flex
4th	Chi Chi vs. Sinister^{^{*}}	Chi Chi

The contestant won the challenge and went on a group date with Daisy.
The contestant was named MVP and won a solo date with Daisy.

^* Daisy allowed Sinister to join the group date despite Chi Chi winning the fight because he fought well.

Challenge: Fight For Daisy's Love

First Fight: Chi Chi vs. Fox
Second Fight: Big Rig vs. 12 Pack
Third Fight: Flex vs. 6 Gauge
Fourth Fight: Chi Chi vs. Sinister

- Challenge Winners: Big Rig, Chi Chi, Flex, Sinister
- MVP: Big Rig
- Bottom 3: 6 Gauge, 12 Pack, Fox
- Eliminated: 6 Gauge
- Elimination Notes:
  - 6 Gauge was eliminated because Daisy felt that she and 6 Gauge were not connecting.

=== Call's Fair in Love and War ===
First aired June 14, 2009

- Challenge: None
  - There was no challenge in this episode because Daisy felt the contestants had been working hard enough, but she took several of them on dates. She and 12 Pack went to a lingerie store, and she had dinner with Big Rig, Chi Chi, and Fox later on that night.
- MVP: 12 Pack
- Bottom 3: None
- Eliminated: Fox
- Elimination Notes:
  - No chains were given out during this episode because Daisy told Fox to leave at the beginning of the elimination, as her suspicions that he had a girlfriend were confirmed when she called the house.

=== Still Haven't Found What I'm Cooking For ===
First aired June 21, 2009

Contestant	Assigned Meal	Win / Lose
12 Pack	Red Velvet Cake	12 Pack
Big Rig	Zucchini Quiche	Big Rig
Chi Chi	French Onion Soup	Chi Chi
Flex	Chicken Cordon Bleu	Flex
Sinister	Lasagna	Sinister

The contestant won the challenge, but did not go on a date with Daisy.
The contestant won the challenge, but was named most compatible for Daisy by the other contestants and won a solo date with her.
The contestant won the challenge and went on a date with Daisy because they named the least compatible with Daisy by the other contestants.

- Challenge: Cook A Meal For Daisy
- Challenge Winner: None (all meals were good)
- Bottom 2: Big Rig, Chi Chi
- Eliminated: Big Rig
- Elimination Notes:
  - Daisy said that she was not falling in love with Big Rig and felt that he was not that compatible with her.

=== The Return of the Fling ===
First aired June 28, 2009

Match Up	Match up	Date	Bottom 2
Chi Chi	Flex	Off Road Vehicle Riding	Chi Chi
12 Pack	Sinister	Dinner	Sinister

The contestant earned a chain, and was not eliminated.
The contestant was eliminated.

- Challenge: None

Date 1: Off Road Vehicle Riding with Chi Chi and Flex
Date 2: Dinner with 12 Pack and Sinister

- MVP: 12 Pack
- Special Guest/Brought Back: London
- Bottom 2: Chi Chi, Sinister
- Eliminated: Chi Chi
- Elimination Notes:
  - Daisy said that she felt Chi Chi was more of a close friend and hoped they could remain friends.

=== The Past and the Furious ===
First aired July 12, 2009

Contestant	Ex Girlfriend	MVP/Eliminated
12 Pack	Cathy	12 Pack
Sinister	Ashley	Sinister
London	Natasha	London
Flex	Kia	Flex

The contestant had some MVP time with Daisy.
The contestant was eliminated.
The contestant was asked to go to Maui with Daisy.
The contestant was supposed to be eliminated, but Daisy decided to keep the contestant and bring him to Maui with her.
The Special Guest was a friend, instead of an Ex Girlfriend.

- Challenge: None
- MVP: N/A
- Special Guest: Boys Ex Girlfriends
- Bottom 2: Flex and Sinister
- Eliminated: Sinister
- Elimination Notes:
  - Daisy felt that she was keeping Sinister in the house to protect him and not to hurt his feelings, making her feel like she led him on.

=== Clip Show ===
First aired July 19, 2009

Daisy reviews her "Rules of Dating" to the viewers based on her many experiences in the house, featuring memorable moments and clips not aired in the main episodes. Including:

- The "Bromances" going on in the house.
- Fox's "not so deep" thoughts on love.
- Additional drama footage.
- The guys "primping" themselves.
- Extended footage of the skunk in the house.

=== Leid and Neutered ===
First aired July 26, 2009

- 3rd Place: 12 Pack
- 2nd Place: Flex
- Winner: London

The final three head to Maui to spend some quality time in the world's most romantic island. But there is trouble in paradise when Daisy narrows the field to 2 in a tear-filled elimination on a desolate airstrip. The two remaining guys go on emotional final dates with Daisy. Only one guy can be her Rockstar, while the other finds out that "aloha" also means "goodbye".

- Elimination Notes:
  - 12 Pack was eliminated because Daisy felt that too many people are trying to push her into choosing him.
  - No reasons given for Flex’s elimination, Daisy merely said that she picked London.
