= Strength of a Woman (song) =

2002 single by Shaggy

Single by Shaggy

from the album Lucky Day
- Released: 14 October 2002
- Genre: Reggae pop
- Length: 3:49
- Label: MCA
- Songwriter(s): Orville Burrell; Christopher Birch; Michael Fletcher; Ricardo "Rik Rok" Ducent; Robert Browne; Shaun Darson; Shaun Pizzonia
- Producer(s): Shaun "Sting International" Pizzonia

Shaggy singles chronology
"Hey Sexy Lady" (2002)	"Strength of a Woman" (2002)	"Get My Party On" (2003)

"Strength of a Woman" is a song recorded by Jamaican-American reggae artist Shaggy for his sixth studio album Lucky Day (2002). It was penned by Shaggy, Shaun "Sting International" Pizzonia, Christopher Birch, Ricardo Ducent, Michael Fletcher, Shaun Darson, and Robert Browne, with production provided by Pizzonia. Shaggy's label, MCA Records, released it on 14 October 2002, to contemporary hit radio in the United States as the second single from Lucky Day following the underperformance of the album's lead single, "Hey Sexy Lady", in the country.

While it was not a huge success in the United States, it managed to peak within the US Bubbling Under Hot 100 chart and had some minor success on pop radio. Internationally, it became a top ten hit in Romania and top twenty hit in Austria and Italy.

== Critical reception ==
Eric Aiese of Billboard magazine noted the complete contrast between "Strength of a Woman" and Shaggy's previous hit single "It Wasn't Me", calling the track a "four-minute glorification" of women. Aiese said the track marked a new achievement for the singer: "His vocal is entirely sung, and background singers add harmony to the chorus," and noted it was to be a hit on top 40 radio. Leyton Bracegirdle of Capital FM however, called the track horrific and "really bad."

== Track listing ==
Maxi single
No.	Title	Producer(s)	Length
1.	"Strength of a Woman" (Original Version)	Shaun "Sting International" Pizzonia	3:57
2.	"Strength of a Woman" (Romain Tranchert Radio Edit)	Pizzonia; Romain Tranchart^{[a]}	3:46
3.	"Strength of a Woman" (Graham Stack/Groove Brother Radio Edit)	Birch; Graham Stack^{[a]}	3:30
4.	"Hey Sexy Lady" (Bedroom Rockers Mix Radio Edit)	Christopher Birch; Bedroom Rockers^{[a]}	3:31
5.	"Strength of a Woman" (Video)

Notes

- ^{^[a]} denotes remix producer

== Charts ==
=== Weekly charts ===
Weekly chart performance for "Strength of a Woman"
Chart (2003)	Peak position
Australia (ARIA)	31
Austria (Ö3 Austria Top 40)	14
Belgium (Ultratop 50 Flanders)	26
Europe (Eurochart Hot 100 Singles)	61
European Radio (Music & Media)	36
Germany (GfK)	23
Italy (FIMI)	17
Netherlands (Dutch Top 40 Tipparade)	6
Netherlands (Single Top 100)	67
New Zealand (Recorded Music NZ)	50
Romania (Romanian Top 100)	10
Switzerland (Schweizer Hitparade)	26
US Bubbling Under Hot 100 Singles (Billboard)	19
US Pop Airplay (Billboard)	39
US CHR/Pop (Radio & Records)	38

=== Year-end charts ===
Year-end chart performance for "Strength of a Woman"
Chart (2003)	Position
Romania (Romanian Top 100)	67
