= Escape from Cape Coma =

Studio album by Twisted Method
- Released: July 15, 2003
- Recorded: August–October 2002
- Studios: Master Control, Burbank, CA
- Genres: Nu metal; alternative metal
- Length: 46:13
- Label: MCA
- Producers: Jason Slater; Rob Caggiano; Eddie Wohl; Paul Orofino

Twisted Method chronology
Twisted Method EP (1998)	Escape from Cape Coma (2003)

Singles from Escape from Cape Coma
- 1. "Reach Out" Released: 2003

Escape from Cape Coma is the only studio album by American nu metal band Twisted Method. It was released on July 15, 2003 through MCA Records. It was the label's final release, following its absorption into Geffen Records a month prior.

== Reception ==
Professional ratings
Review scores
Source	Rating
AllMusic	2/5 stars
Hit Parader	B+
IGN	8.4/10
ThePRP	2/5 stars

Escape from Cape Coma received polarized reviews from critics.

Hit Parader praised Twisted Method's flux of energy on the album, which was described as "coil[ing] like a striking cobra and blast[ing] like a Tomahawk missile", and praised the band for not copying the "same-old sounds" of "today's hard rock scene". Dave Doray of IGN was highly positive of the album and awarded it an "Editors' Choice Award". While he praised the album's "sonic intensity" and Derrick Tribbett's diverse vocal performances, he noted that the album's swearing and "full-tilt" energy was, at points, excessive.

Writing for Allmusic, Johnny Loftus criticised Escape from Cape Coma's "heavily treated production" and excessive swearing, and felt that the album and its aggressive outlook was formulaic and ingenuine. ThePRP's Jason Doe was heavily critical of the album, labelling it a "musical abortion" and called it "an album for listeners who desire anthemic, brainless hard rock that they can sing-a-long to without even remotely thinking; An album that rebels against absolutely nothing, but does so in such a manner that you almost believe Twisted Method actually have a purpose."

== Track listing ==
All tracks are written by Twisted Method.

No.	Title	Length
1.	"The End"	3:17
2.	"Fled"	3:58
3.	"Reach Out"	3:36
4.	"Change Me"	3:23
5.	"Inside Out"	4:09
6.	"Mannequin"	3:04
7.	"Awkward Silence"	4:10
8.	"Panic"	2:47
9.	"Shine"	3:56
10.	"Rot"	3:18
11.	"125"	2:58
12.	"Newborn"	4:45
13.	"Faceless"	2:47
Total length:		46:13

== Personnel ==
Personnel per liner notes.

Twisted Method
- Derrick "Tripp" Tribbett – vocals
- Andrew Howard – guitar/vocals
- Derek DeSantis – bass/vocals
- Ben Goins – drums/vocals

Production

- Jason Slater – producer
- Eddie Wohl – additional production, mixing (for Scrap 60 Productions)
- Rob Caggiano – additional production, mixing (for Scrap 60 Productions)
- Paul Orofino – additional production, mixing (for Scrap 60 Productions)
- Rob Brill – engineering
- George Marino – mastering (at Sterling Sound)
- Gary Ashley – executive producer
Management
- Hans Haedelt – A&R
- Jock Elliott – marketing director
- Charlie Pennachio – representation (for 3Sixty Management)
- Steve Ballard – representation (for 3Sixty Management)
- Kenny Meisclas – legal representation (for Grubham, Indursky & Schindler)

Artwork and design

- Tim Sledman – art direction (with Twisted Method), design
- JP Robinson – design
- Justin Stephens – photography
- John Millhauser – set design
- Katharine Adams – stylist (with Twisted Method)
- Hee Soo Kwon – hair/makeup stylist
