= Jim Fifield =

James G. Fifield is an American businessman, who was President and CEO of EMI from 1988 to 1998.

== Background ==
Prior to joining EMI, Fifield became a vice president at General Mills in 1984. In 1985, he became president and chief executive of CBS/Fox Video.

== EMI ==
During his tenure, EMI became the number one publishing company and the third largest music company in the world, with operations in over 70 countries and sales in excess of $4 billion. Operating profits grew from $5 million in 1988 to over $550 million in 1998, disposing of Thorn to Thorn EMI to redefine the company as a music business.

Acquisitions carried out under Fifield's tenure included Japan's Toshiba/EMI for over $400m, SBK Publishing for $337m (in 1989), Chrysalis for £70m, and Virgin for $950m, amongst dozens of other lesser known labels.

During his tenure, the company expanded into Eastern Europe and Latin America. He also led the company through global consolidation during a time of transition, reconfiguring the business to reflect the emergence of the CD, closing vinyl businesses, and consolidating the cassette businesses. In November of 1992 he leaks Ordinary World by Duran Duran to a couple of Florida radio stations three months before the intended release. A Jacksonville station receives a hundred calls about it in the first day. Capitol ends up rushing the US single for an early release.

Fifield was forced out of EMI in the spring of 1998, after an unsuccessful bid to become the chief executive of EMI Group. He was bought out of his contract for 12 million pounds, reportedly the largest corporate buyout in UK history at the time.

In 2007, he pursued a bid to purchase EMI with London-based financier Sam Glover, which was later withdrawn.
