= Twisted Method =

American nu metal band

- Origin: Cape Coral, Florida, U.S.
- Genres: Nu metal; alternative metal
- Years active: 1998–2005 (Reunions: 2012, 2014)
- Labels: MCA; Geffen
- Spinoffs: Makeshift Romeo
- Past members: Derrick "Tripp" Tribbett; Derek DeSantis; Virus; Tony Elchert; Andrew Howard; Ben Goins
- Website: twistedmethod.com

Twisted Method was an American nu metal band. It was formed in 1998 in Cape Coral, Florida, by Mariner High School students Derrick "Tripp" Tribbett, Ben Goins, Andrew Howard and Derek DeSantis. For the latter part of their existence, the band was based in Fort Myers, Florida.

After signing a million-dollar record deal with MCA Records, Twisted Method released their first and only album, Escape From Cape Coma, in 2003. The band subsequently promoted its release with extensive touring, including an appearance on the second stage of the 2003 Ozzfest tour. Twisted Method disbanded in June 2005, following the departure of guitarist Andrew Howard and drummer Ben Goins. On September 16, 2005, Howard was found dead. The band has since returned in 2012 and 2014 for two reunion shows.

== History ==
=== Formation and early years (1998–2001) ===
Twisted Method was founded in 1998 after its band members met each other at Mariner High School. In the beginning, when both were 14 years old, Ben Goins ("13EN") met guitarist Andrew Howard, and after hearing about his ambitions to start a band, Goins decided to start jamming with him. Howard would jam with Goins at his house. Sometime after, Derek DeSantis, a friend of the two who hung out while they would jam, decided to become the band's bassist, and pawned off his PlayStation in order to buy a bass guitar. During their sophomore years, the band attempted to recruit a second guitarist, without much success. One of the people who auditioned told the band about Derrick "Tripp" Tribbett, whose parents owned a PA system, and they subsequently went to visit him to use their equipment. One day, Tribbett asked the band if he could become their vocalist, and the band's lineup solidified. The band performed their first show at a Halloween party, and spent the next four years performing locally.

=== MCA/Geffen and Escape from Cape Coma (2002–2004) ===
In early 2002, Twisted Method performed a show as an opener for another local band, Cinder, who were doing a label showcase. The band's performance at that show attracted the attention of Cinder's manager, Charlie Pennachio, who subsequently signed the band to his management company, 3Sixty Management. A clause in Pennachio's contract with Twisted Method stated that he would get the band signed within six months. He was able to do it in five, and after the band had performed a number of showcases for record labels, Twisted Method was able to sign a five-year, $5.5 million contract with MCA Records; MCA signed the band without a demo, and solely on the basis of live performance.

In August 2002, Twisted Method travelled to Los Angeles to record what would be their first album, Escape from Cape Coma, and worked on the album until September 2002. The title is a sarcastic reference to their home town, which they described as a place where "old people retire - it's like the walking dead". In preparation for the album's release, MCA bought the band a spot on the second stage of the 2003 Ozzfest tour for $75,000. The album was supposed to be released around May 2003, but owing to MCA's merger into Geffen Records that same month, the album was pushed back to July 15, 2003. Despite rumours suggesting that the band would be dropped, Twisted Method's contract was transferred over to Geffen. Things were looking up when Geffen indicated they would finance a second album, send the group on tour with Dope twice in 2004, and record demos in June with Edsel Dope. Twisted Method toured with Dope and Motograter in 2004 as part of the American Apathy tour.

=== Hiatus and the death of Andrew Howard (2005–2011) ===
In July 2005, Twisted Method went on an "indefinite hiatus" after guitarist Andrew Howard and drummer Ben Goins quit the band. Howard left because he wanted to be with his family after becoming a father, and Goins found Christianity.

Andrew Howard was found dead in his bed on Friday afternoon, September 16, 2005, aged 23. His exact cause of death remains unsolved, but a preliminary analysis of his body found traces of methadone, an enlarged heart from cocaine abuse and also a small injury in his larynx from unknown origin.

The remaining Twisted Method members, Derrick Tribbett and Derek DeSantis, quickly formed a new group named Makeshift Romeo. In addition to Makeshift Romeo, vocalist Derrick "Tripp" Tribbett fills in on bass for Dope, and bassist Derek DeSantis has joined the band EkoTren, which toured with Ill Niño. Tribbett also recorded solo material under the stage name Sinister and collaborated with John Rich.

=== Return from hiatus (2012–2014) ===
On October 28, 2012, Twisted Method performed a reunion show at the Dixie Roadhouse in Cape Coral, Florida. Tony Elchert of EkoTren and Virus of Dope both filled in for Andrew Howard on lead guitar.

On December 19, 2014, Twisted Method once again performed a reunion show. This time it was at The Buddha in Fort Myers, Florida.

== Members ==
- Derrick "Tripp" Tribbett – vocals (1998–2005, 2012, 2014)
- Derek DeSantis – bass (1998–2005, 2012, 2014)
- Andrew Howard – guitars (1998–2005; died 2005)
- Ben Goins (13EN) – drums (1998–2005)
- Virus – guitars (2012, 2014)
- Tony Elchert – drums (2012, 2014)

== Awards and nominations ==
Online Metal Awards
Year	Nominee / work	Award	Result	Ref.
2003	Escape from Cape Coma	Album of the Year	Nominated	
2003	Twisted Method	Artist of the Year	Nominated	
2003	Twisted Method	Live Artist of the Year	Nominated	
2003	Twisted Method	Best Newcomer	Won	
2003	TwistedMethod.com	Best Website	Nominated	

== Discography ==
Studio albums

- Escape from Cape Coma (2003)

EPs

- Twisted Method (1998)(2024)
1. Let Me Down
2. Postal
3. Get Up
4. Bombs
5. Pain

DVDs

- Look Inside My Twisted World (2005)
