= Derrick Tribbett =

American singer

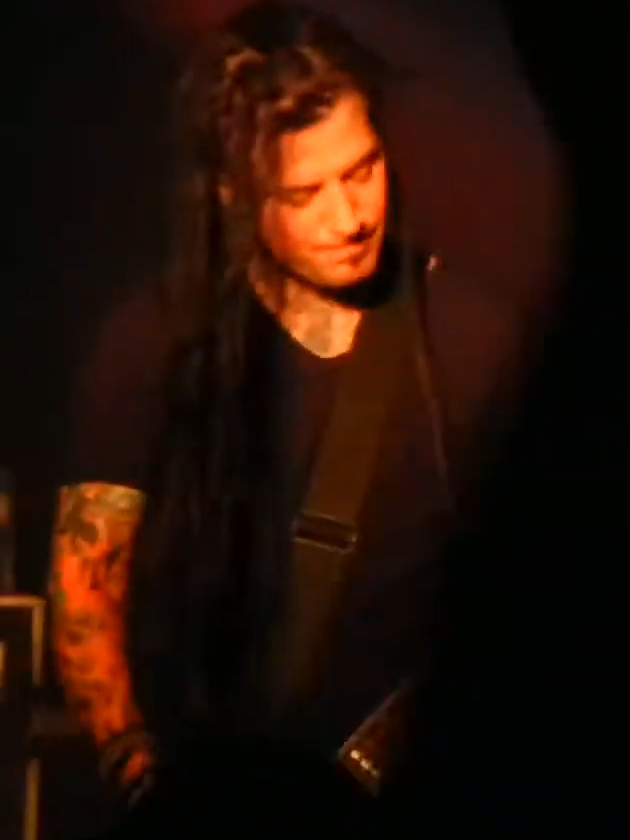
- Tribbet with Dope in 2013

Background information
- Also known as: Tripp Lee; Sinister
- Born: December 18, 1984 (age 41); Peoria, Illinois, U.S.
- Origin: Cape Coral, Florida, U.S.
- Genres: Nu metal; alternative metal; industrial metal
- Occupations: Singer; musician; songwriter
- Instruments: Vocals; bass guitar
- Years active: 1998–present
- Member of: Dead Wyte
- Formerly of: Twisted Method; Makeshift Romeo; Dope

Derrick Tribbett (born December 18, 1984), better known by his stage names Tripp Lee and Sinister, is an American musician who is the lead vocalist of heavy metal band Twisted Method. He is the younger brother of Audiotopsy and Mudvayne lead guitarist Greg Tribbett. He is also known for his role on the reality show Daisy of Love starring former Rock of Love 2 contestant Daisy De La Hoya.

== Career ==
Tribbett was a member of the band Twisted Method until it disbanded in 2005 and formed the band Makeshift Romeo shortly after. He was the bassist and backing vocalist for the band Dope. Tribbet formed a new band Bullet Saints and released a one and only single “Hell Bound” in 2013. In 2026, Tribbett, along with brother Greg Tribbett, formed a metal band called Dead Wyte, in which they perform vocals and guitar respectively.

=== Media appearances ===
Tribbett was a contestant on the VH1 show Daisy of Love. He went under the alias "Sinister" on the show. He was eliminated on the July 12, 2009 episode, the tenth episode in the twelve episode series (not counting the clip show). He placed fourth overall.

Tribbett would have been a contestant on the third season of the VH1 show I Love Money which takes contestants from other VH1 shows such as Flavor of Love, Rock of Love, I Love New York, Real Chance of Love, Daisy of Love and Megan Wants a Millionaire, and to be aired in January 2010. However, the show was canceled before airing because of Ryan Jenkins' involvement in the murder of his wife and suicide.

== Filmography ==
Television
Year	Title	Role	Notes
2005	Twisted Metal: Look Inside My Twisted World	Self; feature	Documentary
2009	Daisy of Love	Self; contestant	4th place, 10 episodes
2009	I Love Money season 3	Self; contestant	Unaired
2020	Talk of Love	Self; guest	2 episodes
2021	All Star Reunion Show	Self; feature	Web series, 2 episodes

== Personal life ==
Tribbett is the younger brother of Greg Tribbett, the lead guitarist and backing vocalist of heavy metal bands Audiotopsy and Mudvayne and former member of Hellyeah. One of his other brothers Matt Tribbett was a drum technician for the American metal band Slipknot.
