= MCA Records =

American record label

MCA Records, Inc.
- Final logo, used from 1997 to 2003
- Parent company: MCA Inc. (1972–1989); MCA Music Entertainment Group (1989–1996); Universal Music Group (1996–2003)
- Founded: 1934; 92 years ago (as Decca Records); 1972; 54 years ago (became MCA Records)
- Founder: MCA Inc.
- Defunct: 2003; 23 years ago (Absorbed into Geffen Records)
- Distributor: Interscope Capitol Labels Group
- Genre: Various
- Country of origin: United States
- Location: 70 Universal City Plaza, Universal City, California (1972–2000); 2220 Colorado Avenue, Santa Monica, California (2000–2003)

MCA Records was an American record label owned by MCA Inc. established in 1972, though MCA had released recordings under that name in the United Kingdom from the 1960s. The label achieved success in the 1970s through the 1980s, often by acquiring other record labels, such as ABC, Motown, and Geffen. The MCA record label was folded into Universal Music Group's Geffen Records in 2003, but Universal's now-renamed Music Corporation of America continues to use the MCA moniker.

== History ==
=== Background ===
The U.S. arm of Britain's Decca Records was established in New York in 1934 In 1937, the owner of Decca, Edward R. Lewis, chose to split off the UK Decca company from the U.S. company (keeping his U.S. Decca holdings), fearing the financial damage that would arise for UK Companies if the emerging hostilities of Nazi Germany should lead to war – correctly foreseeing World War II. Lewis sold the remainder of his American Decca holdings when war did break out. U.S.-based Decca Records kept the rights to the Decca name in North and South America and parts of Asia including Japan. UK Decca owned the rights to the Decca name in the rest of the world. After the war, British Decca formed a new U.S. subsidiary, London Records. During this time, American Decca issued records outside North America on the Coral Records and Brunswick Records labels.

=== The early years ===
In 1962, MCA, a talent agency and television production company, entered the recorded music business with the acquisition of American Decca, which became a wholly owned subsidiary. As American Decca owned Universal Pictures, MCA was forced to exit the talent agency business in order to complete the merger. MCA assumed full ownership of Universal and made it into a top film studio, producing several hits.

In 1966, MCA formed Uni Records and in 1967, purchased Kapp Records which was placed under Uni Records management.

Brunswick and Coral were replaced by the new MCA label, which was used to release U.S. Decca and Kapp label material outside North America. Initial activity as MCA Records was based in London and MCA Records UK was formally launched on February 16, 1968. Among the early artists on the MCA label, around 1971, were groups Wishbone Ash, Osibisa, Stackridge and Budgie, and solo artists Tony Christie, Mick Greenwood and Roy Young.

Early MCA UK releases were distributed by Decca, but moved to EMI in 1974. As the U.S. division of MCA Records was not established until 1972, the earliest UK MCA Records material was released in the U.S. on either Kapp or Decca. MCA UK also issued American Brunswick material on the MCA label until 1972, two years after MCA lost control of Brunswick, after which American Brunswick material was issued in the UK on the revived Brunswick label. Uni label material was issued on the Uni label worldwide.

=== MCA Records formation in Canada and the United States ===
In 1970, MCA reorganized its Canadian record company Compo Company Ltd. into MCA Records (Canada). In April 1970, former Warner Bros. Records president Mike Maitland joined MCA and initially served as Decca's general manager. Maitland was unsuccessful in his attempt to consolidate Warner Bros. Records with co-owned Atlantic Records which led to his departure from Warner.

In April 1971, Maitland supervised the consolidation of the New York–based Decca and Kapp labels plus the California-based Uni label into MCA Records based in Universal City, California, with Maitland serving as president. The three labels maintained their identities for a short time, but were retired in favor of the MCA label in 1973. "Drift Away" by Dobie Gray became the final Decca pop label release in the U.S. in 1973. Beginning the same year, the catalogs of Decca, Uni and Kapp were reissued in the U.S. on the MCA label under the supervision of veteran Decca producer Milt Gabler.

=== Early success ===
The first MCA Records release in the U.S. was former Uni artist Elton John's "Crocodile Rock" single in 1972, which appeared on a plain black and white label. Immediately following this, the American MCA label used a black with curved rainbow design until the late 1970s. This design was directly inspired by the U.S. Decca label of the 1960s.

In December 1972, Neil Diamond, another Uni artist, reached superstar status with his first MCA release, the live multi-platinum Hot August Night. Elton John's double album Goodbye Yellow Brick Road was released in October 1973 and was number one on the U.S. Billboard 200 albums chart for eight straight weeks. The management of former Decca artists the Who had formed their own label Track Records in the UK, but were still under contract with MCA for American distribution. The Who's double album Quadrophenia was released by Track/MCA also in October 1973. Quadrophenia peaked at number 2 as it was held back from the number 1 slot by Goodbye Yellow Brick Road.

Other successful artists on MCA, after the consolidation, included former Kapp artist Cher, and Uni artist Olivia Newton-John. In 1973 MCA released the highly successful soundtrack album to the film The Sting. The movie used the Ragtime music of Scott Joplin, arranged and conducted by Marvin Hamlisch. It won an Academy Award for Best Original Score (MCA issued many other soundtracks to films from Universal, along with some non-Universal films).

One of the most successful MCA artists in this era was the rock band Lynyrd Skynyrd, who would become one of the most popular in the Southern rock genre. The group was discovered by Al Kooper and initially released on his Sounds of the South label imprint of MCA. The song "Free Bird" became one of the most popular songs of all time on album-oriented rock radio stations. On Second Helping, the group recorded a song about their relationship with the label called, "Workin' for MCA". Street Survivors was released in October 1977, just prior to a tragic plane crash in which members of the group were either killed or severely injured. The original Street Survivors cover had a picture of the band members surrounded by flames, but this was quickly substituted for a design without flames. Lynyrd Skynyrd's streak of hits ended after the crash. Eventually, three Lynyrd Skynyrd albums reached the double platinum sales level and at least two others reached platinum or gold levels.

During the 1970s and 1980s, MCA profited from reissuing classic early rock and roll recordings made by artists who recorded for the numerous labels absorbed by MCA. One notable example was the 1954 Decca recording "Rock Around the Clock" by Bill Haley & His Comets, which was featured as the lead track of MCA's number one–charting American Graffiti soundtrack album, and as a single returned to the American top 40 that year, 20 years after it was recorded. MCA Records also profited from its 1974 release of a soundtrack album of the Hollywood film music that appears in the movie That's Entertainment!.

=== Expansion and struggles ===
In 1977, MCA president Sidney Sheinberg set up the Infinity Records division, based in New York City with Ron Alexenberg as CEO. Alexenberg had been with the Epic division of CBS Records, now Sony Music Entertainment. The intention was to give MCA a stronger presence on the East Coast. The only big hit the Infinity label had was "Escape (The Piña Colada Song)" by Rupert Holmes, a number one single at the end of 1979. Infinity also had some success with Hot Chocolate, Spyro Gyra, New England and TKO. But MCA pulled the plug on Infinity after it failed to sell most of the one million advance copies of an album featuring Pope John Paul II in October 1979. Infinity was fully absorbed by the parent company in 1980.

In 1979, Bob Siner replaced Maitland as MCA Records president. Shortly afterwards, MCA acquired ABC Records along with its subsidiaries Paramount, Dunhill, Impulse!, Westminster, and Dot. ABC had acquired the Paramount and Dot labels when they purchased Gulf+Western's record labels and Famous Music Corp. Thus, MCA now controlled material once owned by Paramount Pictures, the music released by Paramount's record labels, and the pre-1950 films by Paramount as well.

Also included in this deal were recordings controlled by ABC, including albums by Tom Petty and the Heartbreakers which were originally released by Shelter Records. Petty was furious about the reassignment of his contract and refused to record for MCA. This led to a series of lawsuits, which resulted in his bankruptcy in 1980. Petty and other ABC/Shelter artists eventually had their contracts transferred to the Backstreet Records label, which was distributed by MCA. ABC Records' independent distributors sued ABC and MCA for $1.3 million in damages for being stuck with unsold ABC recordings they could not return to MCA. The better selling ABC Records catalog albums were reissued on the MCA label.

MCA distribution in Europe and Asia moved to CBS in 1979, while releases in the 1980s were self-distributed, or through WEA. Distribution moved to BMG during the 1990s.

=== The 1980s ===
The combined effects of the Infinity Records failure, the purchase of ABC, rising vinyl costs and a major slump in record sales produced tremendous losses for the company between 1979 and 1982. It was not until the mid-1980s that the record labels returned to significant profitability. In late 1980, MCA received negative publicity when it attempted to raise the list price of new releases by top selling artists from $8.98 to $9.98 ($35.09 and $39 in 2025 dollars respectively). This policy, known as "superstar pricing", ultimately failed. The Xanadu soundtrack album and Gaucho, by former ABC act Steely Dan, were the first releases with the higher list price. Backstreet artist Tom Petty succeeded in his campaign to force MCA to drop prices back to $8.98 for the release of his album Hard Promises, in May 1981.

MCA had a distribution deal with the independent label Unicorn Records, which in turn signed an agreement with another rising independent label, SST Records to manufacture and distribute Black Flag's first album Damaged. Reportedly, MCA executive Al Bergman heard an advance copy of the album and refused to let MCA Distributing Inc. handle it, stating that it was "an anti-parent record". The members of Black Flag found themselves covering the MCA Distributing logo on the first 25,000 copies with a sticker reading "As a parent... I found it an anti-parent record."

SST Records partner Joe Carducci later said that Bergman's comments were actually a red herring for MCA to cut ties with Unicorn, which had not produced any successful releases; the fact that MCA would, not soon afterward, directly commission a new recording of "TV Party" from Black Flag and SST Records for the Repo Man soundtrack seemed to bear this out. Unicorn would later go out of business after going bankrupt, partially the result of a lawsuit between themselves and Black Flag.

=== Recovery, further expansion and MCA Music Entertainment Group ===
Irving Azoff became the head of MCA Records in 1983. Azoff is known as an experienced music industry veteran who received credit amongst MCA management and staff for saving the company from bankruptcy.

In 1983, rock musician Frank Zappa negotiated a distribution agreement for his Barking Pumpkin label with MCA. As the records were being manufactured, a woman in the quality control department objected to the lyrics of Zappa's album Thing-Fish. After this MCA cancelled the Zappa contract. At about the same time, Zappa publicly argued with members of the Parents Music Resource Center (PMRC) over censorship and warning stickers for albums with potentially offensive content. The experience with MCA prompted Zappa to create a satirical "WARNING/GUARANTEE" sticker of his own. Thing-Fish was released with Zappa's sticker in December 1984 under a new agreement with Capitol/EMI. Despite the conflict with Zappa, MCA later became the biggest label to oppose the PMRC and the use of warning stickers. In October 1985, Azoff said "Never will you find a sticker on one of our records."

In the 1980s, MCA became commonly nicknamed "Music Cemetery of America" due to a huge surplus of unprofitable records sitting unsold in MCA warehouses. A number of MCA associates, including Azoff and Zappa, disparaged the company in this way.

Starting in 1984, William Knoedelseder wrote a series of articles for the Los Angeles Times about the connections between organized crime and MCA. Knoedelseder told the story of mobster Sal Pisello and the corrupt deals he arranged with MCA for the liquidation sales of unsold cut-out recordings that had been deleted from the MCA catalog. The story was later adapted into the book Stiffed: A True Story of MCA, the Music Business, and the Mafia, which was published in 1993.

The Chess Records catalog was acquired from the remnants of Sugar Hill Records in 1985. Motown Records was bought in 1988. In the late 1980s, MCA formed Mechanic Records as a sub-label for releasing heavy metal music. Bands signed to Mechanic included Voivod, Dream Theater, Bang Tango, and Trixter.

MCA created a new holding company in 1989 called MCA Music Entertainment Group, headed by Al Teller, former President of United Artists Records, and co-chairman of Turf Classics, a concert production company, run by Producer Richard Flanzer. The same year the MCA Inc. parent company was purchased by the Matsushita group.

Azoff resigned from MCA in 1989 to form his own record label, the now-defunct Giant Records. Richard Palmese was named president of MCA Records after Azoff in 1990.

=== The 1990s ===
GRP Records and Geffen Records were acquired in 1990. Unlike most of MCA's previous acquisitions, GRP (which began managing MCA's jazz holdings) and Geffen (which became a second mainstream subsidiary) labels kept their identities. MCA sold Motown Records to PolyGram in 1993.

Singer and songwriter Alanis Morissette became a noteworthy MCA artist in Canada with her debut album in 1991. After her second album in 1992 she was dropped following disagreements in artistic direction. However, the company kept her on their song publishing roster, both being owned by Universal Music. Morissette's next album, Jagged Little Pill (written and produced independently, but released through Warner Music's Maverick Records label) eventually sold more than 30 million copies.

=== Universal Music Group ===
In 1995, drinks conglomerate Seagram Company Ltd. acquired 80% of MCA. In November of that year, Teller was fired and replaced by former Warner Music Group head Doug Morris. Palmese left MCA a week later. Afterwards, Jay Boberg was named as the new president of MCA. On December 9, 1996, the new owners dropped the MCA name; the company became Universal Studios, Inc. and its music division, MCA Music Entertainment Group, was renamed Universal Music Group (UMG), headed by Morris.

In 1997, MCA Records adopted a new logo that featured the parent company's former full name, Music Corporation of America. That many younger people had been unaware of what MCA had stood for in the past inspired the new logo. In conjunction with the new logo, the first MCA Records website was launched. In 1998, MCA released the sophomore album Feeling Strangely Fine by Semisonic, which had the number one hit single and video, "Closing Time", about the use of alcohol in local night clubs and taverns. In the same year, MCA also released Maybe You've Been Brainwashed Too, the debut album by alternative rock band New Radicals, which had the number one hit single, "You Get What You Give".

On May 21, 1998, Seagram acquired PolyGram (owner of British Decca) from Philips and merged it with Universal Music Group. Unlike several labels under PolyGram and UMG, who faced closure and job cuts of employees, MCA was the only label that was not affected by the merger. When Seagram's drinks business was bought by France-based Pernod Ricard, its media holdings (including Universal) were sold to Vivendi which became Vivendi Universal which was later renamed back to Vivendi SA after selling most of the entertainment division (which included Universal Pictures) to General Electric. Morris continued to head the combined company, still called Universal Music Group.

=== MCA label phaseout ===
On January 16, 2003, Jay Boberg resigned from his position as president of MCA Records. Boberg's resignation arrived in the wake of slumping sales at MCA, which had seen the label's overall album market share decline to just 2.61% in 2002, down from 9% the previous year. His demise was hastened by the relative commercial failure of Shaggy's Lucky Day, released in October 2002, which MCA hoped would sell well enough to turn around their declining fortunes. Richard Nichols, manager of The Roots, felt that MCA had been attempting to spend lots of money on different projects, and subsequently many acts on MCA were "underfinanced" by the label, leading to poor sales. Rob Hitt of Midtown (who was signed to MCA through Drive-Thru Records) stated that MCA had lost a substantial amount of money that year from investing in several unsuccessful bands.

Management of the label was subsequently handed over to the Interscope Geffen A&M umbrella label and Jimmy Iovine, although UMG chairman Doug Morris promised that MCA would continue to operate as a "full-service, free standing label". Craig Lambert, previously the vice president of the label, was named as the interim head of MCA, with a successor expected to be chosen within a few months. Following Boberg's resignation, it was rumoured that MCA could possibly be merged into Universal Records, something which would have given the latter, New York City–based label a stronger presence in the West Coast of the United States.

On May 20, 2003, insider sources at Universal reporting to Billboard revealed that the MCA label was to be absorbed by sister UMG label Geffen Records by the end of the year. The reported reason behind the MCA brand phaseout was due to declining sales, as well as the MCA brand becoming "tarnished" by "a history of acquisitions and mergers". On June 9, 2003, MCA laid off 75 of their staff, equivalent to a third of their personnel, although no employees from Geffen were let go. Geffen's president, Jordan Schur, was named president of the newly merged entity, which continued under the Geffen branding. In the subsequent months, the MCA name was phased out entirely. The last album to be released under the MCA Records branding was Twisted Method's Escape from Cape Coma, which was released on July 15, 2003.

Today, Interscope Capitol Labels Group and Universal Music Enterprises manage MCA's rock, pop, and urban back catalogues (including those from ABC Records and Famous Music Group) in conjunction with Geffen – UME and Geffen have re-released various albums from MCA in the years since, as well as several compilations. Its country music label MCA Records Nashville is still in operation, and is one of the only businesses using the MCA trademark as of 2016 along with MCA Records France (imprint of Universal Music France). MCA's jazz catalogue is managed by Verve Records (through the Impulse! and GRP imprints, depending on whether the recording was acquired from ABC or not), while its classical music catalogue is managed by Deutsche Grammophon. MCA's musical theatre catalogue is managed by Decca Records on its Decca Broadway imprint.

Following a lengthy two-decade hiatus, Universal Music Group rebranded its country music subsidiary company as MCA, marking the return of the Music Corporation of America to the UMG umbrella once more.

== Logos ==
First MCA Records logo, with lowercase name, used outside the United States from 1967 through 1972.

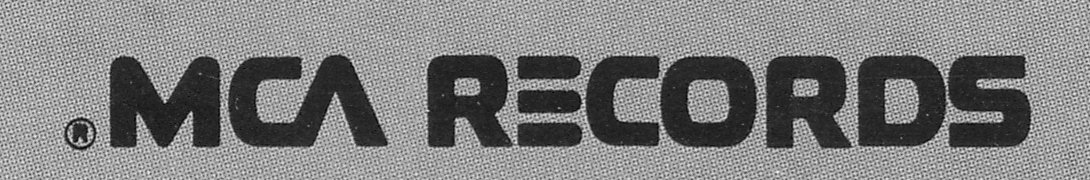
MCA Records logo used from 1972 through 1991. MCA word mark revived by Music Corporation of America.

Previous MCA Records popular music logo; currently used by active label MCA Nashville and MCA Records France.

== Labels ==
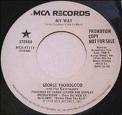
White promotional label used for second logo, 1972 until 1991 (vinyl version)

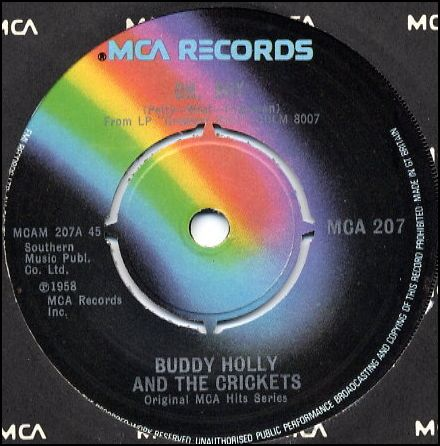
Black Rainbow label used logo 1972 until 1980 (Vinyl Version)

Label used for third logo, 1991 until 1997 (CD version)
