= Courtship =

Period in a couple's relationship which precedes their engagement and marriage

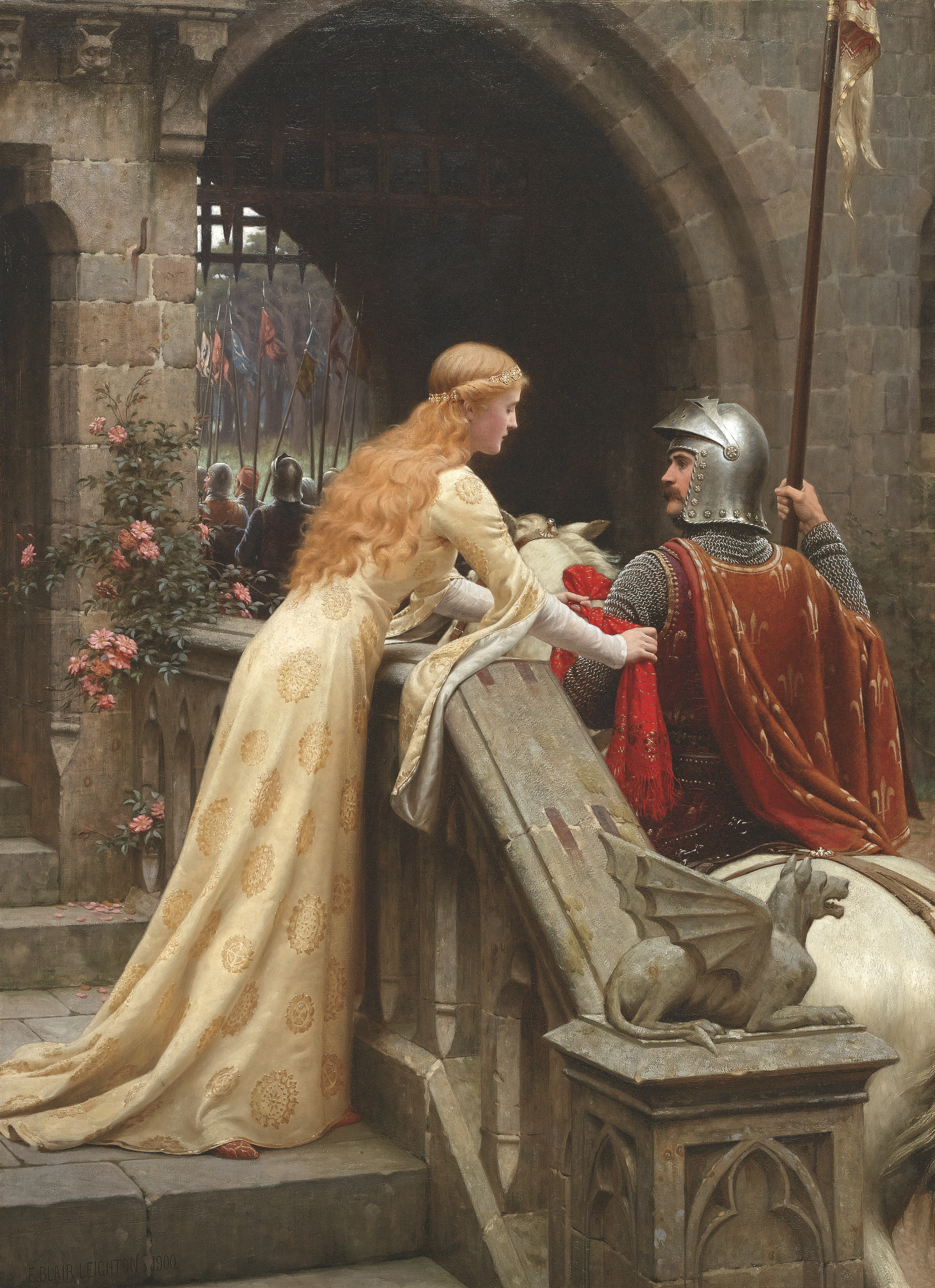
God Speed by English artist Edmund Leighton, 1900: depicting an armored knight departing for war and leaving behind his wife or sweetheart

Courtship is the period when some couples become familiar with each other prior to a possible marriage or committed relationship. Courtship traditionally may begin after a betrothal and may conclude with the celebration of marriage. A courtship may be an informal and private matter between two people or may be a public affair, or a formal arrangement with family approval. Traditionally, in the case of a formal heterosexual engagement, it is the role of a male to actively "court" or "woo" a female, thus encouraging the female to be receptive to a marriage proposal.

Courtship as a social practice is a relatively recent phenomenon, emerging only within the last few centuries. From the standpoint of anthropology and sociology, courtship is linked with other institutions such as marriage and the family which have changed rapidly, having been subject to the effects of advances in technology and medicine.

In non-human animals, courtship refers to sexual behavior that precedes copulation.

== History ==
In the past, marriages in most societies were arranged by parents and older relatives with the goal not being love but legacy and "economic stability and political alliances", according to anthropologists. Accordingly, there was little need for a temporary trial period such as courtship before a permanent community-recognized union was formed between a man and a woman. While pair-bonds of varying forms were recognized by most societies as acceptable social arrangements, marriage was reserved for heterosexual pairings and had a transactional nature, where wives were in many cases a form of property being exchanged between father and husband, and who would have to serve the function of reproduction. Communities exerted pressure on people to form pair-bonds in places such as Europe; in China, society "demanded people get married before having a sexual relationship" and many societies found that some formally recognized bond between a man and a woman was the best way of rearing and educating children as well as helping to avoid conflicts and misunderstandings regarding competition for mates.

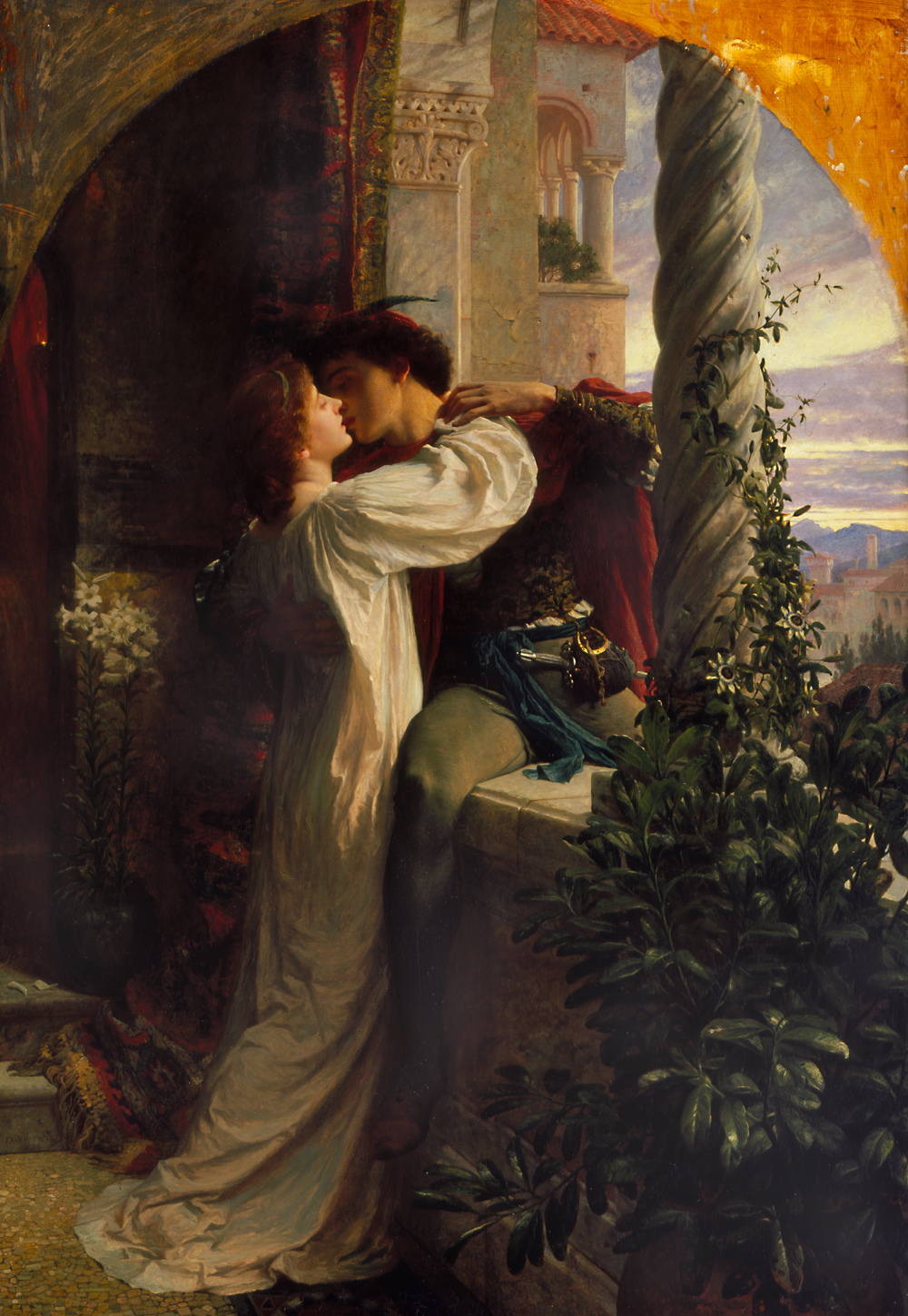
The clandestine meeting between Romeo and Juliet in Shakespeare's play. Painting by Sir Frank Dicksee, 1884

Generally, during much of recorded history of humans in civilization, and into the Middle Ages in Europe, marriages were seen as business arrangements between families, while romance was something that happened outside of marriage discreetly, such as covert meetings. The 12th-century book The Art of Courtly Love advised that "True love can have no place between husband and wife". According to one view, clandestine meetings between men and women, generally outside of marriage or before marriage, were the precursors to today's courtship.

From about 1700 a worldwide movement perhaps described as the "empowerment of the individual" took hold, leading towards greater emancipation of women and equality of individuals. Men and women became more equal politically, financially, and socially in many nations. In the early 20th centuries, women gradually won the right to vote starting in the first sovereign nation Norway in 1913, and to own property and receive equal treatment by the law, and these changes had profound impacts on the relationships between men and women and parental influence declined. In many societies, individuals could decide—on their own—whether they should marry, whom they should marry, and when they should marry in a "courtship ritual where young women entertained gentleman callers, usually in the home, under the watchful eye of a chaperone", but increasingly, in many Western countries, it became a self-initiated activity with two young people going out as a couple in public together. Still, courtship varies considerably by nation, custom, religious upbringing, technology, and social class, and important exceptions with regards to individual freedoms remain as many countries today still practice arranged marriages, request dowries, and forbid same-sex pairings. Although in many countries, movies, meals, and meeting in coffeehouses and other places is now popular, as are advice books suggesting various strategies for men and women, in other parts of the world, such as in South Asia and many parts of the Middle East, being alone in public as a couple is not only frowned upon but can even lead to either person being socially ostracized.

The 1849 book The Whole Art of Polite Courtship; Or the Ladies & Gentlemen's Love Letter Writer exemplifies the importance of love letters in 19th century courtship with a goal of marriage. The book contains 31 love letter samples for men and women in different careers, presumably for readers to draw inspiration when writing their own romantic correspondences. Etiquette books, such as the 1852 Etiquette of Courtship and Matrimony, detail socially appropriate ways to meet lovers, court, arrange a wedding, honeymoon, and avoid arguments.

In the twentieth century, courtship was sometimes seen as a precursor to marriage but it could also be considered as an end-in-itself, that is, an informal social activity akin to friendship. It generally happened in that portion of a person's life before the age of marriage, but as marriage became less permanent with the advent of divorce, courtship could happen at other times in people's lives as well. People became more mobile. Rapidly developing technology played a huge role: new communication technology such as the telephone, Internet and text messaging enabled rendezvous to be arranged without face-to-face contact. Cars extended the range of courtship as well as enabled back-seat sexual exploration.

In the mid-twentieth century, the advent of birth control as well as safer procedures for abortion changed the equation considerably, and there was less pressure to marry as a means for satisfying sexual urges. New types of relationships formed; it was possible for people to live together without marrying and without children. Information about human sexuality grew, and with it an acceptance of all types of consensual sexual orientations is becoming more common. Today, the institution of courtship continues to evolve at a rapid rate with new possibilities and choices opening up particularly through online courtship.

Humans have been compared to other species in terms of sexual behavior. Neurobiologist Robert Sapolsky constructed a reproductive spectrum with opposite poles being tournament species, in which males compete fiercely for reproductive privileges with females, and pair bond arrangements, in which a male and female will bond for life. According to Sapolsky, humans are somewhat in the middle of this spectrum, in the sense that humans form pair bonds, but there is the possibility of cheating or changing partners. These species-particular behavior patterns provide a context for aspects of human reproduction, including courtship. However, one particularity of the human species is that pair bonds are often formed without necessarily having the intention of reproduction. In modern times, emphasis on the institution of marriage, traditionally described as a male-female bond, has obscured pair bonds formed by same-sex and transgender couples, and that many heterosexual couples also bond for life without offspring, or that often pairs that do have offspring separate. Thus, the concept of marriage is changing widely in many countries.

== Duration ==
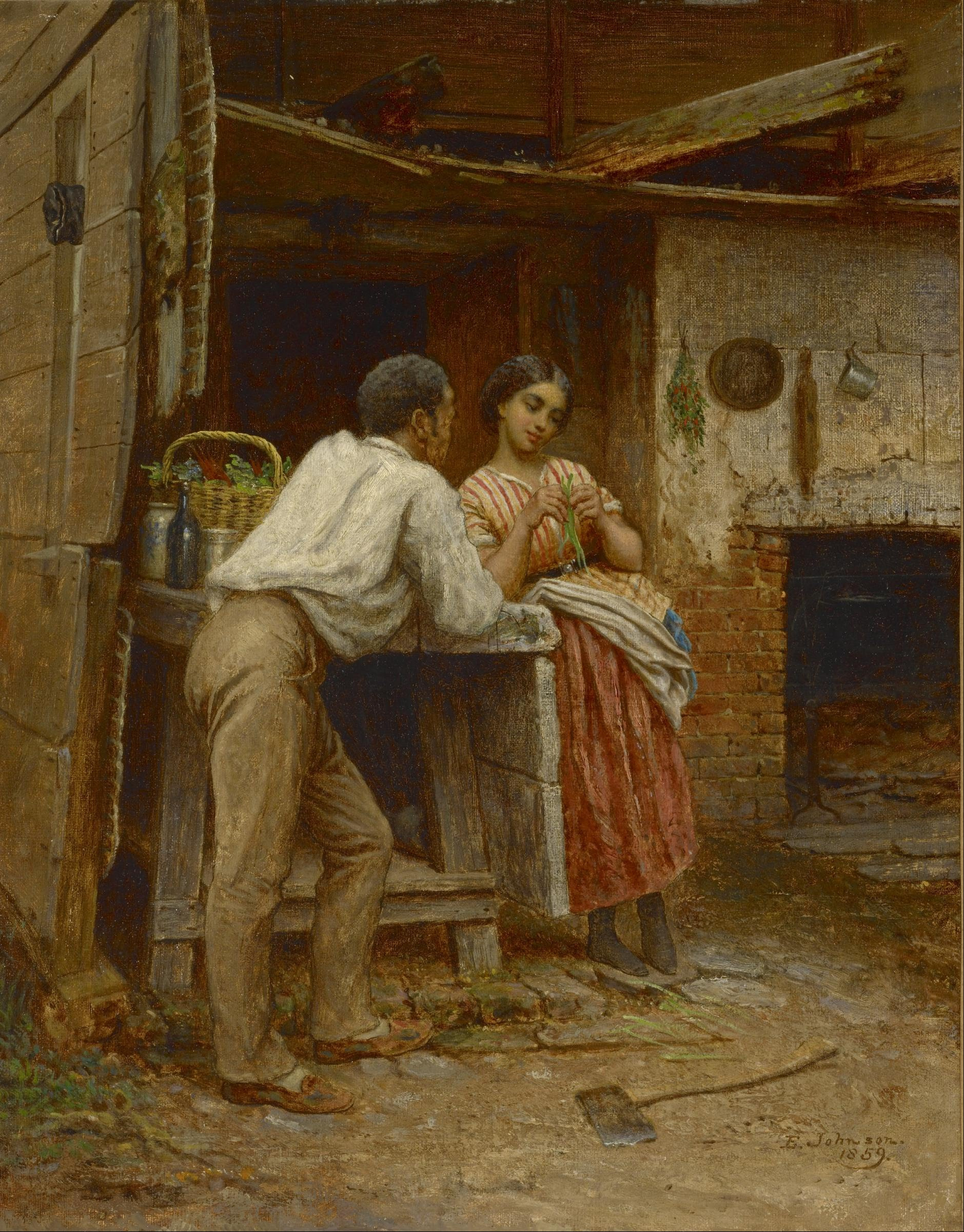
"Southern Courtship" by American painter Eastman Johnson (1824–1906)

The average duration of courtship varies considerably throughout the world. Furthermore, there is vast individual variation between couples. Courtship may be completely omitted, as in cases of some arranged marriages where the couple do not meet before the wedding.

In the United Kingdom, a poll of 3,000 engaged or married couples resulted in an average duration between first meeting and accepted proposal of marriage of 2 years and 11 months, with the women feeling ready to accept at an average of 2 years and 7 months. Regarding duration between proposal and wedding, the UK poll above gave an average of 2 years and 3 months.

== Traditions ==
Fairly casual in most European-influenced cultures, in some traditional societies, courtship is a highly structured activity with very specific formal rules.

In some societies, the parents or community propose potential partners and then allow limited courtship to determine whether the parties are suited. In Japan, there is such a type of courtship called Omiai, with similar practices called "Xiangqin" (相親) in the Greater China Area. Parents will hire a matchmaker to provide pictures and résumés of potential mates, and if the couple agrees, there will be a formal meeting with the matchmaker and often parents in attendance. The matchmaker and parents will often exert pressure on the couple to decide whether they want to marry after a few meetings.

Courtship in the Philippines is one complex form of courtship. Unlike other societies, it takes a far more subdued and indirect approach. Its complexity involves stages, and it is considered normal for courtship to last a year or longer. It is common to see a man showing off by sending love letters and love poems, singing romantic songs, and buying gifts for a woman. The parents are also seen as part of the courtship practice, as their approval is commonly needed before courtship may begin or before the woman gives the man an answer to his advances.

In more closed societies, courtship is virtually eliminated by the practice of arranged marriages in which partners are chosen for young people, typically by their parents. Forbidding experimental and serial courtship and sanctioning only arranged matches is partly a means of guarding the chastity of young people and partly a matter of furthering family interests, which, in such cultures, may be considered more important than individual romantic preferences.

Throughout history, courtship has often included traditions such as exchanging valentines, written correspondence (facilitated by the creation of the postal service in the nineteenth century), and similar communication-based courting. Over recent decades, though, the concept of arranged marriage has changed or simply been mixed with other forms of courtship, including Eastern and Indian ones. Potential couples have the opportunity to meet and socialise with each other before deciding whether to continue the relationship.

== Courtship in social theory ==
Courtship is used by a number of theorists to explain gendering processes and sexual identity. Scientific research into courtship began in the 1980s, after which time academic researchers started to generate theories about modern courtship practices and norms. Researchers have found that, contrary to popular beliefs, courtship is normally triggered and controlled by women, driven mainly by non-verbal behaviours, to which men respond. One of the functions of romantic love is courtship.

This is generally supported by other theorists who specialise in the study of body language. There are some feminist scholars, however, who regard courtship as a socially constructed (and male-led) process organised to subjugate women. Farrell reports, for example, that magazines about marriage and romantic fiction continue to attract a 98% female readership. Systematic research into courtship processes inside the workplace as well as two ten-year studies examining norms in different international settings continue to support a view that courtship is a social process that socialises both sexes into accepting forms of relationship that maximise the chances of successfully raising children.

=== Commercial courtship services ===
As technology has progressed, so too have the methods of courtship. In online courtship, individuals create profiles where they disclose personal information, photographs, hobbies, interests, religion and expectations. Then the user can search through hundreds of thousands of accounts and connect with multiple people at once which in return, gives the user more options and more opportunity to find what meets their standards. Online courtship has influenced the idea of choice. In Modern Romance: An Investigation, Aziz Ansari states that one third of marriages in the United States between 2005 and 2012 met through online courtship services.

Today there are hundreds of sites to choose from and websites designed to fit specific needs such as Match, eHarmony, OkCupid, Zoosk, and ChristianMingle. Mobile apps, such as Grindr and Tinder allow users to upload profiles that are then judged by others on the service; one can either swipe right on a profile (indicating interest) or swipe left (which presents another possible mate).

=== Technology ===
The Internet has become a medium through which people connect. Instagram, Facebook, Skype, Snapchat, WhatsApp, and many other applications may facilitate remote connections.

Online courtship tools are an alternate way to meet potential mates. Many people use online dating mobile apps such as Tinder, Grindr, or Bumble which allow a user to accept or reject another user with a single swipe of a finger. Some critics have suggested that matchmaking algorithms are imperfect and are "no better than chance" for the task of identifying acceptable partners. Others have suggested that the speed and availability of emerging technologies may be undermining the possibility for couples to have long-term meaningful relationships when finding a replacement partner has potentially become too easy.

== Worldwide ==
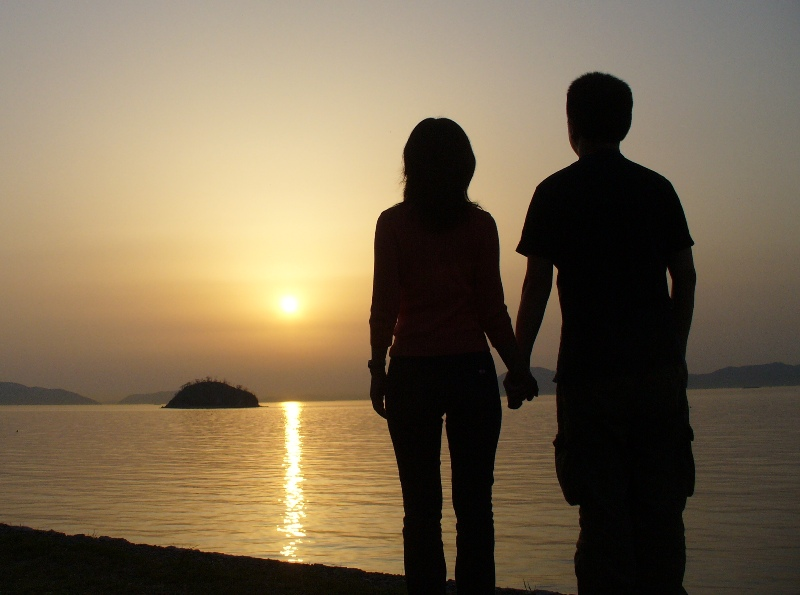
A Japanese couple holding hands on the beach

Courtship customs and habits vary considerably throughout the world. The average duration of courtship before proceeding to engagement or marriage varies considerably throughout the world.

=== Africa ===
==== Ethiopia ====
According to one source, there are four ways that marriage can happen among the Nyangatom people: (1) arranged marriage, when well-respected elders are sent to the girl's family on behalf of the boy's family; (2) courtship after a friendly meeting between boy and girl such as at a market place or holiday where there's dancing; (3) abduction, such as during a blood feud between families; (4) inheritance.

==== North Africa ====
In North Africa like in many parts of the Middle East, sex without marriage is considered unacceptable. Courtship in North Africa is predominantly done under family supervision, usually in a public place.

=== Asia ===
Asia is a mix of traditional approaches with involvement by parents and extended families such as arranged marriages as well as modern courtship. In many cultural traditions, including some in South Asia, and the Middle East and to some extent East Asia, as in the case of Omiai in Japan and the similar "Xiangqin" (相親) practiced in the Greater China Area, a date may be arranged by a third party, who may be a family member, acquaintance, or professional matchmaker.

==== China ====
Patterns of courtship are changing in China, with increased modernization bumping into traditional ways.

A 2003 report in China Daily suggested that courtship for most Chinese university women was "difficult", required work, stole time away from academic advancement, and placed women in a precarious position of having to balance personal success against traditional Chinese relationships. Many women were reported to have high standards for men they sought, but also worried that their academic credentials could "scare away more traditional Chinese men". It was reportedly difficult finding places to have privacy, since many dormitory rooms had eight or more pupils in one suite, while courtship in restaurants tended to be expensive. One student remarked: "American couples drink and dance together. But in China, we study together."

Romantic love is more difficult during times of financial stress, and economic forces can encourage singles, particularly women, to select a partner primarily on financial considerations. Some men postpone marriage until their financial position is more secure and use wealth to help attract women. One trend is towards exclusive matchmaking events for the 'rich and powerful'; for example, an annual June event in Wuhan with expensive entry-ticket prices for men (99,999 RMB) lets financially secure men choose so-called bikini brides based on their beauty and education, and the financial exclusivity of the event was criticized by the official news outlet China Daily. Surveys though from 2015 to 2018 suggest that the majority of Chinese respondents (especially college students) would place the character and personality of their partners above material assets, with also increasing acceptance towards evenly splitting bills or going Dutch.

There have been conflicting reports on expatriate courtship in China's capital city. One account in 2006 suggested the courtship scene in Beijing to be "sad" with particular difficulties for foreign women hoping to find romance. It was reportedly due to the cold, uninterested, or unappealing attitudes of the male expats and the shyness and cultural differences of the Chinese men, and another account in 2010 documented similar, if slightly improved results. A different report in 2010, though, suggested that some Chinese men preferred Western women, viewing them as less girlish and materialistic, and also more independent and straightforward than Chinese women. A 2016 survey of Chinese students abroad, however, imply there have been significant barriers to foreign courtship, and the intermarriage rate of Chinese women in Shanghai has been decreasing.

A new format of Internet "QQ" chat rooms is gaining ground against so-called "traditional courtship agencies" in Changsha (Hunan Province); the QQ rooms have 20,000 members, and service is much less expensive than courtship agencies which can charge 100 to 200 yuan ($13 to US$26) per introduction. Internet courtship, with computer-assisted matchmaking, is becoming more prevalent; one site supposedly has 23 million registered users. Speed dating has come to Shanghai and other cities. Worldwide online matchmakers have explored entering the Chinese market via partnerships or acquisitions.

Each year, November 11 has become an unofficial holiday known as China's Singles' Day when singles are encouraged to make an extra effort to find a partner. Worried parents of unmarried children often arrange dates for their offspring on this day as well as others. Before the day approaches, thousands of college students and young workers post messages describing their plans for this day. In Arabic numerals, the day looks like "1111", that is, "like four single people standing together", and there was speculation that it originated in the late 1990s when college students celebrated being single with "a little self-mockery" but a differing explanation dates it back to events in the Roman Empire. For many, Singles' Day offers people a way to "demonstrate their stance on love and marriage". In 2005, a government-sponsored agency called Shanghai Women's Activities Centre (Chinese: Jinguoyuan) organized periodic matchmaking events often attended by parents.

There has been concern that young people's views of marriage have changed because of economic opportunities, with many choosing deliberately not to get married, as well as young marrieds who have decided not to have children, or to postpone having them. Cohabiting relationships are tolerated more often. Communities where people live but do not know each other well are becoming more common in China like elsewhere, leading to fewer opportunities to meet somebody locally without assistance. Divorce rates are rising in cities such as Shanghai, which recorded 27,376 divorces in 2004, an increase of 30% from 2003.

Relationships between students preparing for college are frowned upon by many parents in China. There was a report that sexual relations among middle schoolers in Guangzhou sometimes resulted in abortions. There have been reports of scams involving get-rich-quick schemes; a forty-year-old migrant worker was one of a thousand seduced by an advertisement which read "Rich woman willing to pay 3 million yuan for sperm donor" but the worker was cheated out of his savings of 190,000 yuan (US$27,500).

The game show If You Are the One, titled after Chinese personal ads, featured some provocative contestants making sexual allusions and the show reportedly ran afoul of authorities and had to change its approach. The two-host format involves a panel of 24 single women questioning a man to decide if he will remain on the show; if he survives, he can choose a girl to date; the show gained notoriety for controversial remarks and opinions such as model Ma Nuo saying she prefer to "weep in a BMW than laugh on a bike", who was later banned from making appearances.

==== India ====
The custom of Indian arranged marriages requires little courtship, although there are strong indications that the institution is undergoing change, and that love marriages are becoming more accepted as India becomes more intertwined with the rest of the world. In the cities at least, it is becoming more accepted for two people to meet and try to find if there is compatibility.

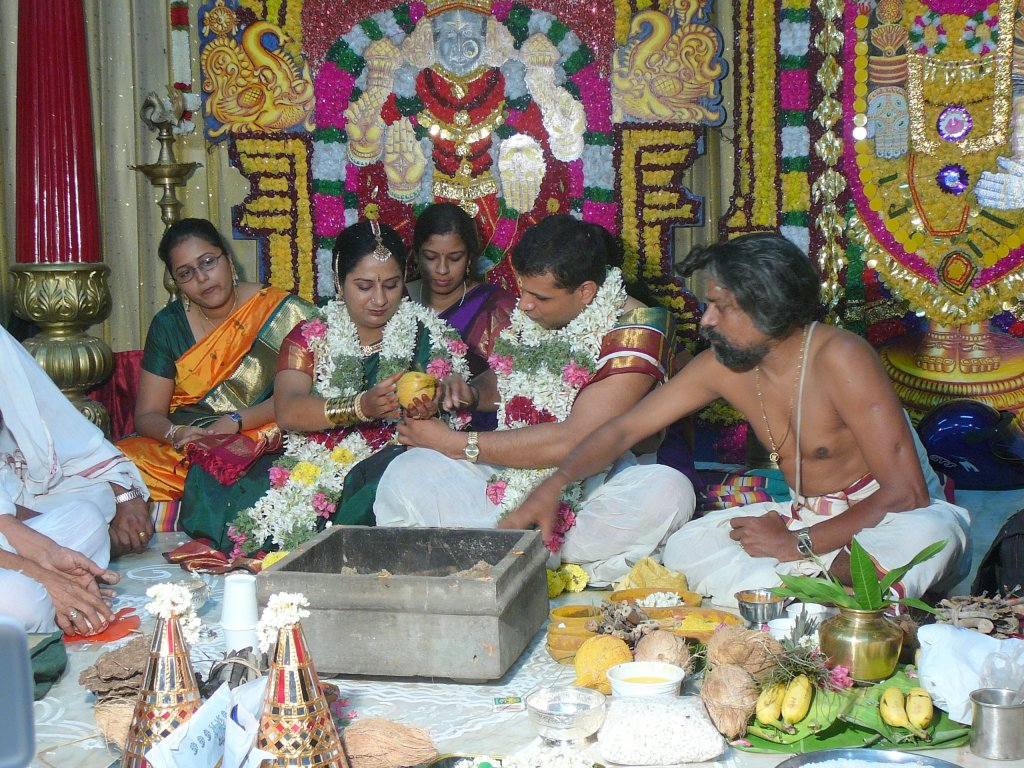
An Indian wedding

The majority of Indian marriages are arranged by parents and relatives, and one estimate is that 7 of every 10 marriages are arranged. Sometimes the bride and groom do not meet until the wedding, and there is no courtship or wooing before the joining. In the past, it meant that couples were chosen from the same caste and religion and economic status. There is widespread support for arranged marriages generally. Writer Lavina Melwani described a happy marriage which had been arranged by the bride's father, and noted that during the engagement, the woman was allowed to go out with him before they were married on only one occasion; the couple married and found happiness. Supporters of arranged marriage suggest that there is a risk of having the marriage fall apart whether it was arranged by relatives or by the couple themselves, and that what's important is not how the marriage came to be but what the couple does after being married. Parents and relatives exert considerable influence, sometimes posting matrimonial ads in newspapers and online. Customs encourage families to put people together, and discourage sexual experimentation as well as so-called serial courtship in which a prospective bride or groom meets but continually rejects possible partners, since the interests of the family are seen as more important than the romantic needs of the people marrying. Indian writers, such as Mistry in his book Family Matters, sometimes depict arranged marriages as unhappy. Writer Sarita Sarvate of India Currents thinks people calculate their "value" on the "Indian marriage market" according to measures such as family status, and that arranged marriages typically united spouses who often did not love each other. She suggested love was out of place in this world because it risked passion and "sordid" sexual liaisons. Love, as she sees it, is "Waking up in the morning and thinking about someone." Writer Jennifer Marshall described the wife in an arranged marriage as living in a world of solitude without much happiness, and feeling pressured by relatives to conceive a son so she would not be considered as "barren" by her husband's family; in this sense, the arranged marriage did not bring "love, happiness, and companionship". Writer Vijaysree Venkatraman believes arranged marriages are unlikely to disappear soon, commenting in his book review of Shoba Narayan's Monsoon Diary, which has a detailed description of the steps involved in a present-day arranged marriage. There are indications that even the institution of arranged marriages is changing, with marriages increasingly being arranged by "unknown, unfamiliar sources" and less based on local families who know each other. Writer Lavina Melwani in Little India compared Indian marriages to business deals:

Until recently, Indian marriages had all the trappings of a business transaction involving two deal-making families, a hardboiled matchmaker and a vocal board of shareholders – concerned uncles and aunts. The couple was almost incidental to the deal. They just dressed and showed up for the wedding ceremony. And after that the onus was on them to adjust to the 1,001 relatives, get to know each other and make the marriage work.

— Lavina Melwani,

Relationships in which courtship is undertaken by two people without parental involvement and sometimes carry on clandestine get-togethers, has become increasingly common. When this leads to a wedding, the resulting unions are sometimes called love marriages. There are increasing instances when couples initiate contact on their own, particularly if they live in a foreign country; in one case, a couple met surreptitiously over a game of cards. Indians who move abroad to Britain or America often follow the cultural patterns of their new country: for example, one Indian woman met a white American man while skiing, and married him, and the formerly "all-important relatives" were reduced to bystanders trying to influence things ineffectively. Factors operating worldwide, such as increased affluence, the need for longer education, and greater mobility have lessened the appeal for arranged marriages, and these trends have affected criteria about which possible partners are acceptable, making it more likely that pairings will cross previously impenetrable barriers such as caste or ethnic background. Indian Americans in the U.S. sometimes participate in Singles Meets organized by websites which happen about once a month, with 100 participants at each event; an organizer did not have firm statistics about the success rate leading to a long-term relationship but estimated about one in every ten members finds a partner through the site.

Courtship websites are gaining ground in India. Writer Rupa Dev preferred websites which emphasized authenticity and screened people before entering their names into their databases, making it a safer environment overall, so that site users can have greater trust that it is safe to meet others on the site. Dev suggested that such websites were much better than the anonymous chatrooms of the 1990s.

During the interval before marriage, whether it is an arranged or a love marriage, private detectives have been hired to check up on a prospective bride or groom, or to verify claims about a potential spouse made in newspaper advertising, and there are reports that such snooping is increasing. Detectives investigate former amorous relationships and can include fellow college students, former police officers skilled in investigations, and medical workers "with access to health records".

Transsexuals and eunuchs have begun using Internet services in some states in India.

The practice of courtship runs against some religious traditions, and one particular Hindu group Sri Ram Sena threatened to "force unwed couples" to marry, if they were discovered courtship on Valentine's Day; a fundamentalist leader said "drinking and dancing in bars and celebrating this day has nothing to do with Hindu traditions." The threat sparked a protest via the Internet which resulted in cartloads of pink panties being sent to the fundamentalist leader's office. as part of the Pink Chaddi Campaign (Pink Underwear/Panties Campaign). Another group, Akhil Bharatiya Hindu Mahasabha, threatened to do the same, for which it was severely mocked online and on the day after Valentine's Day, had protesters outside its Delhi headquarters, with people (mockingly) complaining that it did not fulfill its "promise", with some having come with materials for the wedding rituals.

In India, parents sometimes participate in websites designed to match couples, with some offering to organize double or group socialising.

==== Japan ====
There is a type of courtship called Omiai in which parents hire a matchmaker to give resumes and pictures to potential mates for their approval, leading to a formal meeting with parents and matchmaker attending. If the couple has a few rendezvous, they are often pressured by the matchmaker and parents to decide whether or not to marry.

==== Korea ====
The reasons for courtship in Korea are various. Research conducted by Saegye Daily showed that teenagers choose to keep company for reasons such as "to become more mature", "to gain consultation on worries, or troubles", or "to learn the difference between boys and girls", etc. Similarly, a news report in MK Daily showed that the primary reasons for courtship for workers of around ages 20–30 are "emotional stability", "marriage", "someone to spend time with", etc. An interesting feature in the reasons for courtship in Korea is that many Koreans are somewhat motivated to find a partner due to the societal pressure that often views single persons as incompetent.

Present Korean courtship shows a changing attitude due to the influence of tradition and modernization. There are a lot of Confucian ideas and practices that still saturate South Korean culture and daily life as traditional values. Patriarchy in Korea has been grounded on Confucian culture that postulated hierarchical social orders according to age and sex. Patriarchy is "a system of social structure and practices in which men dominate, oppress and exploit women" which is well reflected in the ways of courtship in Korea. Adding to it, there is an old saying that says a boy and a girl should not sit together after they have reached the age of seven. It is one of the old teachings of Confucianism and reveals its inclination toward conservatism.

Most Koreans tend to regard courtship as a precursor to marriage. According to a survey conducted by Gyeonggi-do Family Women's Researcher on people of age 26–44, 85.7% of respondents replied as 'willing to get married'. The market for marriage agencies are growing continuously. DUO and Gayeon are one of the major marriage agencies in Korea. Also, "Mat-sun", the blind date which is usually based on the premise of marriage, is held often among ages of late 20s to 30s. But the late trend is leaning towards the separation between courtship and marriage unlike the conservative ways of the past. In the survey conducted by a marriage agency, of 300 single males and females who were asked of their opinions on marrying their lovers, about only 42% of the males and 39% of the females said yes. There are also cases of courtship without the premise of marriage. However, the majority still takes getting into a relationship seriously.

Courtship in Korea is also considered a necessary activity supported by society. Korean adults are constantly questioned whether or not they are courting by the people around them. During family gatherings on holidays one of the questions that people hate getting asked the most is related to marriage. According to a survey it was the highest ranked at 47.3 percent.

College students in their sophomore to junior year who have not been in a relationship feel anxious that they are falling behind amongst their peers. Most of them try "sogaeting", going out on a blind date, for the first time to get into a relationship. Courtship is a duty that most people feel they must take on to not seem incompetent. In recent trends, even dramas such as ""Shining Romance" ("빛나는 로맨스"), and "Jang Bo-ri is Here!" ("왔다 장보리"), and in a variety show called, "Dad! Where Are We Going?" ("아빠 어디가?") there are elementary children confessing their love.

Courtship has also been depicted to be an activity of fun and happiness. There are Korean TV programs that film celebrities together as married couples supporting this depiction of courtship such as "We Got Married" ("우리 결혼했어요"), "With You" ("님과 함께") and "The Man Who Gets Married Daily" ("매일 결혼 하는 남자.")

According to a survey by wedding consulting agency, men consider a physical relation as a catalyst of love, otherwise, women regard it as a confirmation of affection. Adding to it, both 79.2% of men and 71.0% of women stated that how deep their physical relation in courtship is concerned in the decision of whether to marry.

==== Pakistan ====
Marriages and courtship in Pakistan are influenced by traditional cultural practices similar to those elsewhere in the Indian subcontinent as well as Muslim norms and manners. Illegitimate relationships before marriage are considered a social taboo and social interaction between unmarried men and women is encouraged at a modest and healthy level. Couples are usually wedded through either an arranged marriage or love marriage. Love marriages are those in which the individuals have chosen a partner whom they like by their own choice prior to marriage, and usually occur with the consent of parents and family. Arranged marriages on the other hand are marriages which are set and agreed by the families or guardians of the two individuals where the couple may not have met before. In either cases and in consistency with traditional marital practices, individuals who marry are persuaded to meet and talk to each other for some time before considering marrying so that they can check their compatibility.

==== Singapore ====
Singapore's largest courtship service, SDU, Social Development Unit, is government-run. The original SDU, which controversially promoted marriages among university graduate singles, no longer exists today. On 28 January 2009, it was merged with SDS [Social Development Services], which just as controversially promoted marriages among non-graduate singles. The merged unit, SDN Social Development Network seeks to promote meaningful relationships, with marriage touted as a top life goal, among all resident [Singapore] singles within a conducive network environment of singles, relevant commercial and public entities.

==== Taiwan ====
Survey of Taiwan students
Statement	Agree
Hopeful they'll find a relationship	37%
Have no clear idea how to approach someone who interested them	90%
"Changes of heart" and "cheating" cause breakups	60%
Willing to resume relationship if problems are resolved	31%
Having more than one relationship at a time isn't good	70%
Women who won't enter a relationship if man lives too far away	70%
Women who believe height in men matters	96%
....source: China Daily	

One report suggested that in southern Taiwan, "traditional rules of courtship" still apply despite the influence of popular culture; for example, men continue to take the initiative in forming relationships. A poll in 2009 of students at high schools and vocational schools found that over 90% admitted that they had "no clear idea of how to approach someone of the opposite sex who interested them". What caused relationships to break up? 60% said "changes of heart" or "cheating". Courtship with more than one person at a time was not permissible, agreed 70%.

==== Iran ====
Legally people of different sexes are not allowed to "mix freely" in public. Since 1979, the state has become a religious autocracy, and imposes Islamic edicts on matters such as courtship. Clerics run officially sanctioned internet courtship agencies with strict rules. Prospective couples can have three meetings: two with strict supervision inside the center, and the third being a "brief encounter on their own"; afterwards, they can either (1) choose to marry or (2) agree to never see each other again. This has become the subject of a film by Iranian filmmaker Leila Lak. Iran has a large population of young people with 70 percent of the 83-million population being under the age of thirty. However, economic hardship discourages marriage, and divorce rates have increased in Tehran to around a quarter of marriages, even though divorce is taboo. While the Iranian government "condemns courtship and relationships", it promotes marriage with (1) online courses (2) "courtship classes" where students can "earn a diploma" after sitting through weekly tests and "hundreds of hours of education" (3) "marriage diplomas" (4) matchmaking and arranged marriages. Authorities push a conservative approach and shun unmarried romantic relationships and encourage "traditional match-making". But young people have disobeyed the restrictions; one said "It is wiser to have different relationships" and believed in defying religious rules which suggest "short-term illegitimate relationships harm dignity". Adultery can be punished by death. While youths can flout selected restrictions, there are almost no instances in which unmarried people move in together. There have been efforts to promote Sigheh (temporary marriage).

Whilst the practice of so-called "white marriage" (cohabitation) is trending, it is illegal.

==== Israel ====
In Israel, in the secular community, courtship is very common amongst both heterosexual and homosexual couples. However, because of the religious community, there are some religious exceptions to the courtship process. In the Haredi and Chasidic communities (Ultra-Orthodox Judaism) most couples are paired through a matchmaker.

==== Lebanon ====
One report suggests courtship is hampered by "the weight of family demands upon individual choice" and that there were difficulties, particularly for people seeking to marry across religious lines, such as a Christian seeking to marry a Muslim.

=== North America ===
==== United States ====
One report suggested the United States as well as other western-oriented countries were different from the rest of the world because "love is the reason for mating", as opposed to marriages being arranged to cement economic and class ties between families and promote political stability. Courtship–known there as 'dating'–by mutual consent of two single people, is the norm. British writer Kira Cochrane, after moving to the U.S., found herself grappling with the American approach to courtship. She wondered why it was acceptable to juggle "10 potential partners" while weighing different attributes; she found American-style dating to be "exhausting and strange". She found courtship in America to be "organized in a fairly formal fashion" with men approaching women and asking point blank for a date; she found this to be "awkward". She described the socially constructed "third date rule" which was that women were not supposed to have sex until the third date even if they desired it, although men were supposed to try for sex. She wrote: "Dating rules almost always cast the man as aggressor, and the woman as prey, which frankly makes me feel nauseous." Canadian writer Danielle Crittenden, chronicling female angst, criticized a tendency not to take courtship seriously and suggested that postponing marriage into one's thirties was problematic:

By waiting and waiting and waiting to commit to someone, our capacity for love shrinks and withers. This doesn't mean that women or men should marry the first reasonable person to come along, or someone with whom they are not in love. But we should, at a much earlier age than we do now, take a serious attitude toward dating and begin preparing ourselves to settle down. For it's in the act of taking up the roles we've been taught to avoid or postpone––wife, husband, mother, father––that we build our identities, expand our lives, and achieve the fullness of character we desire.

— Danielle Crittenden, 1999,

Journalist Emily Witt in 2016 wrote that while "social mores had changed to accept a wider range of sexual practices", there was still much "loneliness and anxiety". She traveled to San Francisco and began dating a lot, using Internet dating services and apps, and sometimes going to singles' bars alone, only to find that the "romantic-comedy concept of love" with a "perfect, permanent, tea-for-two ending" was not going to happen to her.

There is evidence that couples differ in the pace and timing with which they initiate sex in their relationships. Studies show that approximately 50% of premarital young adult couples become sexually involved within the first month of dating, while 25% initiate sex one to three months after beginning to date and a small proportion of couples wait until marriage before initiating sexual relations.

Teenagers and college-aged students tend to avoid the more formal activity of dating, and prefer casual no-strings-attached experiments sometimes described as 'hookups'. It permits young women to "go out and fit into the social scene, get attention from young men, and learn about sexuality", according to one report by sociologists. The term hookup can describe a wide variety of behavior ranging from kissing to non-genital touching; according to one report, only about one third of people had sexual intercourse. A contrary report, however, suggested there has been no "sea change" in sexual behavior regarding college students from 1988 onwards, and that the term hookup itself continued to be used to describe a variety of relationships, including merely socializing or passionate kissing as well as sexual intercourse.

Muslims living in the United States can choose whether to use traditional Islamic methods, or date American-style; Muslims choosing to stick to Islamic tradition can "only marry another Muslim", according to one Malaysian account. Mosques have been known to try to bring people together––one in California has a dating service for Muslims.

=== Europe ===
==== United Kingdom ====
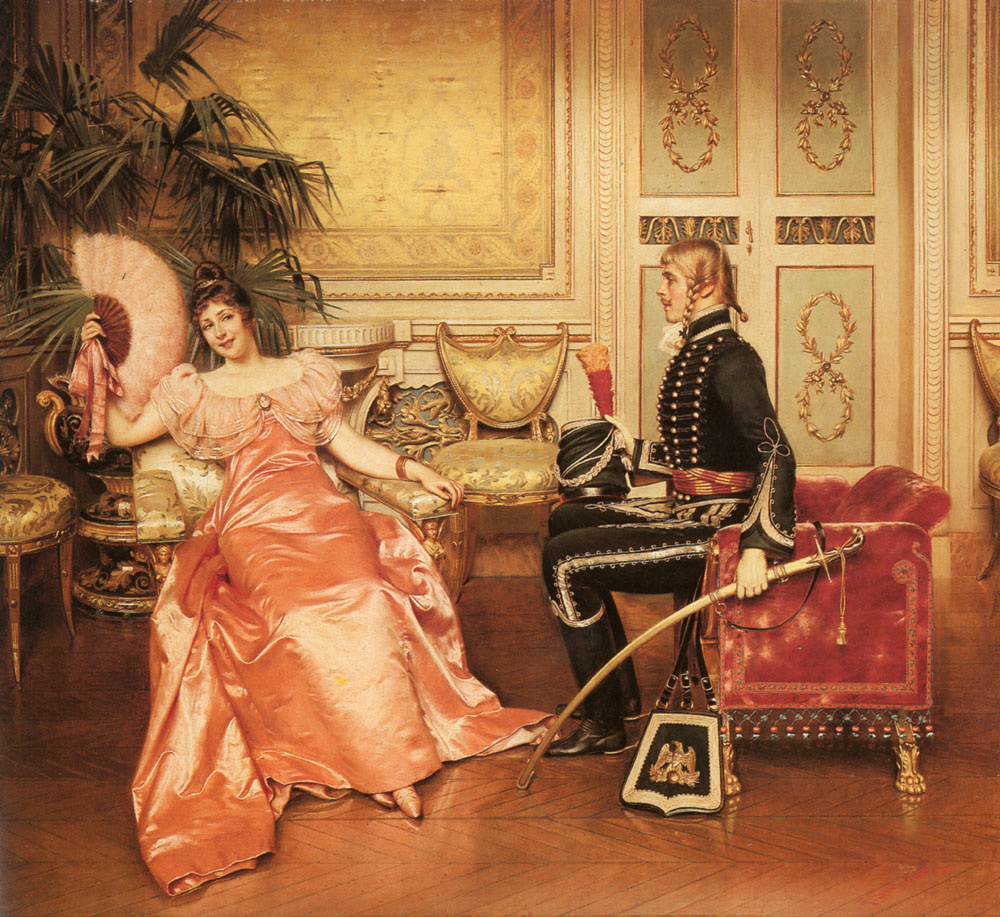
Flirting, aristocratic-style Painting by Frédéric Soulacroix (1858–1933)

In Britain, if two people are 'going out together' their relationship has normally advanced to a relatively long-standing and sexual boyfriend-girlfriend relationship although they are not cohabiting. Writer Kira Cochrane advises to "get out there and meet people" while noting a trend of temporary suspension of marriage until an individual reaches his or her thirties. She sees a trend for developing new ways of meeting people. In contrast, writer Bibi van der Zee found etiquette rules to be helpful, and found that supposedly liberated advice such as "just be yourself" to be the "most useless advice in history". She expresses frustration following fruitless sexual relationships, and that her mid twenties saw relationships with partners who were less willing to return phone calls or display interest in long-term commitment. She felt "clueless and unwanted", she wrote, and found advice books such as The Rules helpful. British writer Henry Castiglione signed up for a "weekend flirting course" and found the experience helpful; he was advised to talk to and smile at everyone he met. Emailing back-and-forth, after meeting on a website, is one way to get to know people in Britain, and elsewhere.

In the UK, one estimate from 2009 was that 15 million people are single, and half of these are seeking a long-term relationship; three-quarters of them have not been in a relationship for more than 18 months. A Pew study in 2005 which examined Internet users in long-term relationships including marriage, found that many met by contacts at work or at school. In a twelve-month period, the average number of assignations that a single person will have is four. When courting, 43% of people 'google' potential partners ahead of time. Almost five million Britons used dating websites in 2008. A third admitting to lying on their profile. A fifth of married individuals between 19 and 25 met their spouse online. One poll in 2009 of 3,000 couples suggested that the average duration of their courtship period, between first meeting to the acceptance of a marriage proposal, was three years. In 2017 Britain online fraud victim numbers were at record high. According to the National Fraud Intelligence Bureau, there were 3,889 victims of so-called romance fraud in 2016. who handed over a record £39m. Online safety in the UK is a concern for authorities and individuals.

==== German-speaking countries ====
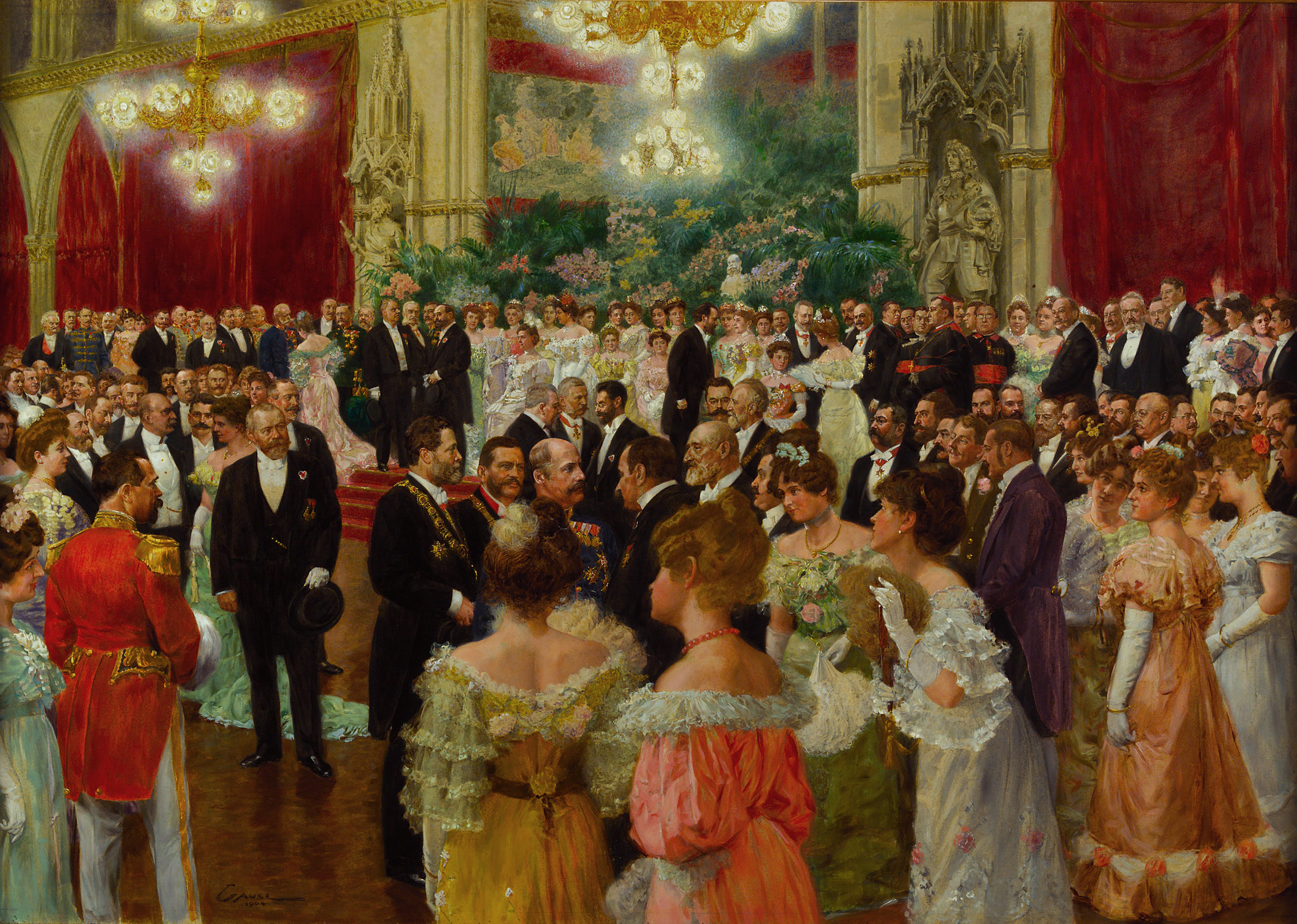
Ball of City of Vienna (1900)

While analysts such as Harald Martenstein and others suggest that it is easier for persons to initiate contact in America, many Germans view the American dating habits as "unspontaneous", "ridiculous" and "rigid". Until the 1960s, countries such as Germany, Switzerland and Austria had a more formal approach for first contacts that was eased during seasonal festivals like carnival and festivals and funfairs like the Oktoberfest, which allowed for more casual flirts.

Membership in voluntary associations is relatively high in German-speaking countries and these provided further chances for possible partners to meet. Strolling on Esplanades and Promenade walkways such as the one in Hamburg called the Jungfernstieg (maidens way), have been another venue for introductions as early as the 19th century. Analyst Geoffrey Gorer described 'dating' as an American idiosyncrasy focusing on youth of college age and expressed in activities such as American 'proms'. In contrast German speaking countries and the longstanding musical tradition there provided ample opportunity of persons of varying ages enjoying social dances, such as the Vienna Opera Ball and other occasions.

Romantic encounters were often described with French terms like rendezvous or tête-à-tête. The German term of Stelldichein (as translated by Joachim Heinrich Campes) is used to signify courtship when the age of consent to marriage was relatively high. German traditions to signify lovers who met in hiding were described with terms like Fensterln (windowing) or Kiltgang (dawn stroll) used in Bavaria and Switzerland. Analyst Sebastian Heinzel sees a major cultural divide between American courtship habits and European informality, and leads to instances in which European expatriates in cities such as New York keep to themselves.

Today, most German couples in long-term relationships get to know each other through mutual friends, at work or while going out at night; the first few months of courtship often involve sexual intercourse, but are still rather casual and do not imply a serious wish to get married.

==== Italy ====
Italians maintain a conservative approach to courtship. Also, inviting friends or relatives during a rendezvous is not uncommon. More modern approaches such as 'blind dates,' 'speed dating' and websites are not as popular as abroad, and are not considered very effective by the majority of the population.

=== Oceania ===
==== Australia ====
A study revealed that 50% of Australians agreed it was permissible to request to 'go out' via a text message but not acceptable to break up this way. Flirting while texting, dubbed flirtext, was more likely to be done by girls after a relationship was started. A survey of newspaper readers suggested it was time to abandon the "old fashioned rule" of men paying for the first outing, based on women's greater earning capacity.

=== South America ===
==== Brazil ====
In Brazil there is a longer time interval before children move out of the house, which affects courtship. As a result, parents offer advice about courtship although it may not be heeded.

== LGBT+ ==
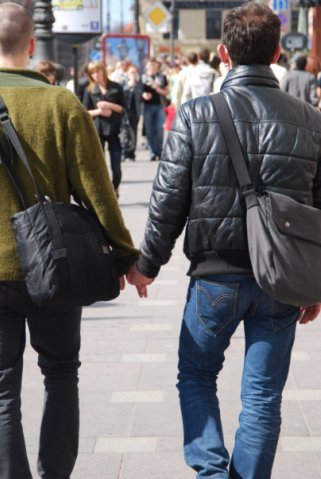
A same-sex male couple holding hands on the street

Courtship behavior of non-heterosexual individuals does not always reflect their self-ascribed sexual orientation. Some of them recognized from early age that they are attracted to the same sex or both/all sexes, but may initially adhere to heterosexual norms in their courtship behaviors. Some individuals who identify as LGBT+ in one way or another but are questioning or have not come out to their peers and family may wait years before they start courting their preferred sex.

According to a Psychology Today report, men who identify as homosexual recognize their same-sex attraction in their late teens or early twenties, and they tend to care more about physical attractiveness than the status of a prospective partner. Men who identify as homosexual, on average, tend to have more sexual partners, while women who identify as lesbian tend to form steadier one-on-one relationships, and tend to be less promiscuous than heterosexual women.

In India, transgender individuals and eunuchs have used internet dating to help them find partners, but there continue to be strong societal pressures which marginalize them.

== Matchmakers ==
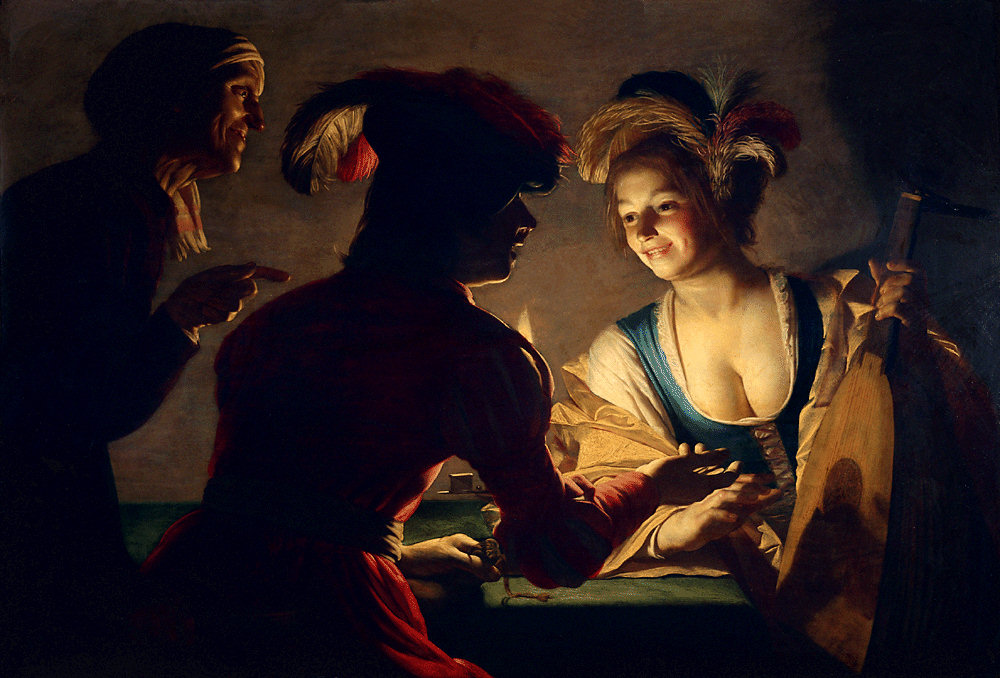
The Matchmaker painting by Gerard van Honthorst (1590–1656)

People can meet other people on their own or the get-together can be arranged by someone else. Matchmaking is an art based entirely on hunches, since it is impossible to predict with certainty whether two people will like each other or not. "All you should ever try and do is make two people be in the same room at the same time", advised matchmaker Sarah Beeny in 2009, and the only rule is to make sure the people involved want to be set up. One matchmaker advised it was good to match "brains as well as beauty" and try to find people with similar religious and political viewpoints. They added that finding like-minded people results in more matches, although acknowledged that opposites sometimes attract.

=== Friends as matchmakers ===
Friends remain a common way for people to meet. However, the Internet promises to overtake friends in the future, if present trends continue. A friend can introduce two people who do not know each other, and the friend may play matchmaker and send them on a blind date.

=== Family as matchmakers ===
Parents, via their contacts with associates or neighbors or friends, can introduce their children to each other. In India, parents often place matrimonial ads in newspapers or online, and may post the resumes of the prospective bride or groom.

=== Matchmaking systems and services ===
Matchmaking systems can be systematic and organized ways to improve matchmaking by using rules or technology. The meeting can be in-person or live as well as separated by time or space such as by telephone or email or chat-based. The purpose of the meeting is for the two persons to decide whether to go out together in the future.

== See also ==
- Arranged marriage
- Bekisa
- Courtship disorder
- Courtship display
- Dating
- Haptic communication
- Human mating strategies
- Hypergamy
- Love letter
- Flash marriage
