= Meng Fei (host) =

Chinese television host

- 孟非
- Born: October 12, 1971 (age 54); Chongqing, China
- Education: Nanjing Normal University
- Occupation: TV host
- Known for: Host of Fei Cheng Wu Rao and Xin Xiang Qin Dai Hui

Meng Fei (Chinese: 孟非; born October 12, 1971), also known as "Grandpa Meng", is a Chinese prime time television host based in Nanjing. He works for Jiangsu Broadcasting Corporation (JSBC). His rise to national fame came with his hosting of the hit TV dating show Fei Cheng Wu Rao (If You Are the One), after which he emerged as a household name.

== Early life and education ==
Born in 1971 in Chongqing, Meng moved to Nanjing with his parents in 1982. He graduated with a B.A. in literature from Nanjing Normal University and has a postgraduate degree from the Jiangsu Party School in Philosophy.

== Career ==
Between 1991 and 1992, Meng worked as a printing assistant at the JSBC's printing factory. Between 1994 and 1996 he worked as a cameraman for the sports department of JSBC. He was an editor and producer, as well as head cameraman for the 1995 documentary series Towards Atlanta (Chinese: 奔向亚特兰大), and continued his journalist career at JSBC's Channel 2 between 1997 and 1999. Starting in 1999 he became a producer and host for Jiangsu Satellite Television's main channel.

Meng Fei became the lead host of Fei Cheng Wu Rao in 2010. Meng attributed the success of the show to the ability of the participants to express their views freely. He regards the "post-80s" generation to be far more expressive of their views than their predecessors in earlier dating shows, none of which reached the high rating levels of Fei Cheng Wu Rao.

Meng went on a brief stint to study at Harvard Business School in 2011.

In March 2018, Meng began to host Dating with the Parents, a combination of elements from Dragon Television's "Chinese Dating with the Parents" and Fei Cheng Wu Rao. Meng currently continues to host Fei Cheng Wu Rao, alongside hosting Dating with the Parents.
