= Meng Fei =

Meng Fei may refer to:

- Meng Fei (gymnast) (born 1981), Chinese female artistic gymnast
- Meng Fei (host), Chinese television show host
