= Dating with the Parents =

Chinese companion dating show hosted by Meng Fei and Zhang Chunye

- Dating With The Parents - Season 7 Titlecard
- Also known as: 新相亲时代 (New Chinese Dating Time) (Season 1)
- Chinese: 新相亲大会
- Hanyu Pinyin: Xīn xiāng qīn dà huì
- Chinese: 新相亲时代
- Hanyu Pinyin: Xīn xiāng qīn shí dài
- Genre: Dating Show
- Presented by: Meng Fei (孟非); Zhang Chunye (张纯烨)
- Country of origin: China
- Original language: Chinese
- No. of series: 7
- No. of episodes: 73

Production
- Production location: Nanjing, China
- Running time: 105 minutes (1 hour, 45 minutes)

Original release
- Network: JSBC
- Release: 25 March 2018

Related
- Chinese Dating with the Parents; If You Are the One (game show)

Xin Xiang Qin Dai Hui (Chinese: 新相亲大会; lit. 'New Chinese Dating Event') (originally broadcast in Season 1 as Xin Xiang Qin Shi Dai (Chinese: 新相亲时代; lit. 'New Chinese Dating Time'), broadcast with the title Dating with the Parents in Australia) is a Chinese companion dating show hosted by Meng Fei and Zhang Chunye. It is made and broadcast on JSBC: Jiangsu Television in Nanjing, China. The show combines elements from two Chinese dating game shows, the first being "Chinese Dating with the Parents", running on rival network Dragon Television, and the second being Jiangsu Television's own show, "If You Are the One", which itself is loosely based on the Taken Out format, and which Meng Fei is also a host of.

== Introduction and History ==
Meng Fei (孟非) started the show in March 2018 and whilst it takes many implements from its predecessor show, he said that "While hosting If You Are the One, many parents came to me and said they wanted to join their children on stage. This is the main reason why we started New Chinese Dating Time".

Different from its sister show If You Are The One, New Chinese Dating Time is specially targeting contestants who are looking at getting married. Even though the age of arranged marriages in China has long disappeared, parents in China still played an important in their children's search for a partner due to the influence of China's traditional patriarchal system and the values of filial piety.

Being 'filial' to one's parents is one of the most mentioned criteria on the show.

== Premise ==
Each week there would be six candidates with their parents and/or family members on the show. The show alternates between a male version and a female version each week. After the introductions of each family, the children of the six groups of families are sent to the soundproof room. A single candidate of the opposite gender then goes on stage one by one to the face the families of the 6 candidates, whilst not being able to see the faces of their children.

The single candidate then plays two videos to reveal information about themselves including their occupation and past relationships. Like on If You Are The One, the families can decide in-between videos whether the candidate is date-worthy for their children by either keeping their light on, or turning their light off. The candidate, the families and the hosts exchange banter with each other when videos are not shown. The children in the soundproof room are able to see the candidate through a separate screen and are also able to communicate with their parents through calling them on the phone in-between videos.

The burst light procedure (simplified Chinese: 爆灯; literally: "burst light") is available for the children in the soundproof room to signify their interest on the candidate. If one of the families' children had activated their burst light, their light can not be turned off, and the family is guaranteed a place in the finalist round.

After both videos have been shown, if there are at least three groups of families still with their lights on, the candidate makes it to the final question round. If there are more than 3 lights left on, the candidate is asked to turn off excess lights until there are three families left. If there are no lights left at the end of both videos, the candidate leaves without a date.

If the candidate is successful to getting to the final round, the candidate then puts forward a question to the three groups of families, followed by inviting the children of the finalist families on-stage for the candidate to ask questions. Following the first round of questions from the candidate to the children of the families, the candidate's family watching proceedings from a different room is asked by the hosts to eliminate one family. It is up to the candidate to follow their family's suggestion or to eliminate another family. The candidate then asks a second round of questions to children of the remaining candidate families. Following that, they are able to choose one of the children from the two remaining groups of families as their date.

Dating with the Parents - Season 1 title card on SBS Viceland in Australia

== See also ==
- Chinese Dating with the Parents (Chinese Style Blind Date) - The predecessor show originally hosted by Jin Xing / Zhang Guoli, and broadcast on Dragon Television.
- If You Are the One (game show)
