= Huang Lan =

Huang Lan may refer to:

- Huanglan, a 3rd-century Chinese encyclopedia
- Huang Lan (TV producer)
