= Chen Chen =

Chen Chen may refer to:

- Chen Chen (actress) (born 1948)
- Chen Chen (host) (born 1979)
- Chen Chen (poet) (born 1989)
