= Jiangsu Broadcasting Corporation =

Chinese media company

Jiangsu Broadcasting Corporation 江苏省广播电视总台(集团)
- Type: Broadcaster
- Industry: Broadcasting
- Founded: June 2001
- Headquarters: Nanjing, Jiangsu, China
- Area served: China
- Owner: Jiangsu Provincial People's Government
- Website: www.jsbc.com

Jiangsu Broadcasting Corporation (JSBC) (Chinese: 江苏省广播电视总台(集团); pinyin: Jiāngsū Shěng Guǎngbò Diànshì Zǒngtái (Jítuán)) is a Chinese television network. It is third biggest television network in China after China Central Television (CCTV) and Hunan Broadcasting System (HBS). The television network is owned by the Jiangsu Provincial People's Government, an agency subordinate to the Jiangsu Provincial People's Congress. The network is based in Nanjing in Jiangsu.

== History ==
Before the establishment of Jiangsu Broadcasting Corporation, the local television stations first aired in Nanjing and southern Jiangsu in October 1952. JSBC was established in June 2001 to compete with other major television networks and expanded its network through nationwide satellite television in January 1997.

== Programming ==
Jiangsu Satellite TV has broadcast numerous reality shows, such as If You Are the One, often referred to as the Chinese version of the Australian dating game show Taken Out.

- Celebrity Battle
- Dating with the Parents
- Fei De Will Watch
- I Can See Your Voice
- If You Are the One
- King of Mask Singer
- Kunlun Fight
- Mask Singer
- Masked Dancing King
- Raid the Cage
- The Brain
- The Shining One (闪闪发光的你)
- Who's Still Standing?
- Win in China
- Zhi Lai Zhi Wang
