= Huang Han =

Chinese psychologist

- 黄菡
- Born: June 22, 1966 (age 60); Anqiu, Shandong
- Education: Nanjing University
- Occupation: Psychologist
- Spouse: Yuan Jian

Huang Han (Chinese: 黄菡; born June 22, 1966) is a Chinese psychologist best known for her participation as a guest on the acclaimed television dating show If You Are the One.

== Early life and education ==
Huang traces her heritage to Anqiu, Shandong, but grew up with her parents in Jiangsu province. She attended Yangzhou High School and Nankai University and later obtained a doctorate in social psychology from Nanjing University.

Her topics of research include gender-based discrimination, reproductive and child-rearing trends, urban-rural sociology, and management psychology.

== Career ==
She holds positions in the Jiangsu Psychology Association and the administration department of the Jiangsu Party School.

== Personal life ==
Huang is married to Yuan Jian (袁剑), an academic. They have a daughter, born in 1997.
