= The Jinxing Show =

Chinese variety show

- 金星秀
- Genre: Late-night talk show, Variety
- Presented by: Jin Xing
- Country of origin: China
- Original language: Chinese

Original release
- Release: January 28, 2015 – August 27, 2017

The Jinxing Show was a Chinese variety show hosted by Jin Xing from 2015 to 2017. Broadcast weekly on Dragon TV, it had an estimated audience of 100 million.
