= Bekisa =

Bekisa is a Zulu custom whereby a man asks a young girl not yet physically matured enough for marriage (considered to be roughly 16) to wait for him so they can be married when she has reached this age. The girl is not required to honour the request, as she may fall in love with whomever she wishes.

== See also ==
- Convention on Consent to Marriage, Minimum Age for Marriage, and Registration of Marriages
- Courtship
- Marriageable age
