= XXS – Extra Extra Small (game show) =

Production
- Running time: 40 minutes
- Production company: Endemol

Original release
- Release: 2010

XXS – Extra Extra Small is a television, physical and family game show created by Endemol Argentina and aired in many countries around the world, where contestants perform other everyday chores in a house built for a giant. The format was first introduce during MIPCOM 2009. The first episode was broadcast in Turkey 2010. It is recorded at Endemol's filming facility in Benavídez, 35 kilometres (22 mi) south of Buenos Aires, Argentina.

== Rules ==
Three pint-sized families vie for cash prizes by seeing who can successfully complete a series of physical challenges. The game is played in a house where everything is 100 times bigger than the contestants, including a giant vacuum cleaner, a huge washing machine, an enormous television, a cup have the size of a tanker truck, kitchen sink with the size of a semi-olympic pool, a fan similar to an airplane propeller, and a spoon and fork as high as a two-story house. A world in which everything found in the average home is suddenly enormous, even the most commonplace household task is dangerous as small accidents at home will turn into adventures, the families will try to prevent a danger in each room and struggle with giant objects for completing the course in the quickest time in order to win the prize.

In the show four timed rounds: a children's round in children room, a mother's round in kitchen, a father's round in the living room, and a family round in a giant washing machine within the laundry room. The show pits families in competitions set in an oversized house that makes them look like mice, climbing giant sofas while using rock climbing techniques, dancing on oversized record players, competing against the clock in toy cars racing down a track, navigate aboard a sponge or swimming in the sink water to fix a leaky pipe that threatens to flood the house, inching across rolling pins over vats of chocolate milk and swimming through obstacles in a pool-sized washing machine. The challenges may sound simple at first, like turning off a hairdryer, closing a water tap, dodge toy soldier bullets, cross a mountain high sneaker, unplug a sparking outlet before a fire breaks out, battle treacherous hurricane winds in an effort to turn off a household fan, or finding a pin in a bowl of pasta, but when faced with gargantuan objects, contestants must find strength, speed, and creativity to succeed. In the final round, the fate of each family is left up to the fathers. Each dad is submerged into a giant washing machine where he must hold on as long as he can for buttons of their team's color while the increasing centrifugal force of the washing machine tests his strength. As velocity increases, soap and water are released and the fathers must avoid being thrown out with the clothes while surviving dizzying spins until one of them manages to turn it off.

And as if that weren't enough, for every challenge that a family previously lost, a five-kilo weight is strapped to the dad's body. The family whose father holds on the longest wins the game.

== International versions ==
Country	Name	Host	Network	Air date
Argentina	Extra Pequeño	Paula Chaves & Darío Lopilato	El Trece	16 May – 4 July 2011
Brazil	Os Encolhidos	Fausto Silva & Caçulinha	Rede Globo	July 2010–4 March 2011
Chile	XXS	Sergio Lagos	Canal 13	Cancelled
China	天哪!我们变小啦! Tian Na!Wo Men Bian Xiao Le! XXS-OMG We Became Smaller	Chen Chen & David Wu (American actor) & Tim Le & Zhu Zhen & Dashan	Shanghai Media Group	1 July – 2 September 2012
Germany	XXS – Hilfe, wir werden geschrumpft!	Johanna Klum & Bürger Lars Dietrich& Wigald Boning	ZDFneo / KI.KA	14 October 2011
Portugal	XXS	Carolina Patrocínio & Pedro Miguel Ramos	SIC/SIC K	14 March – 1 July 2010
Spain	XXS	Pilar Rubio & Enrique Pérez Vergara	Cuatro	25 December 2011
Turkey	XXS-Ekstra Ekstra Small; Extra Extra Small	Ebru Cündübeyoğlu	Star TV	16 April – 11 July 2010
Ukraine	Сімейний розмір Simeyny rozmir	Elena Kravets & Dennis Manzhosov	Inter	11 October – 14 December 2010
