= Huang Lan (TV producer) =

Chinese TV producer

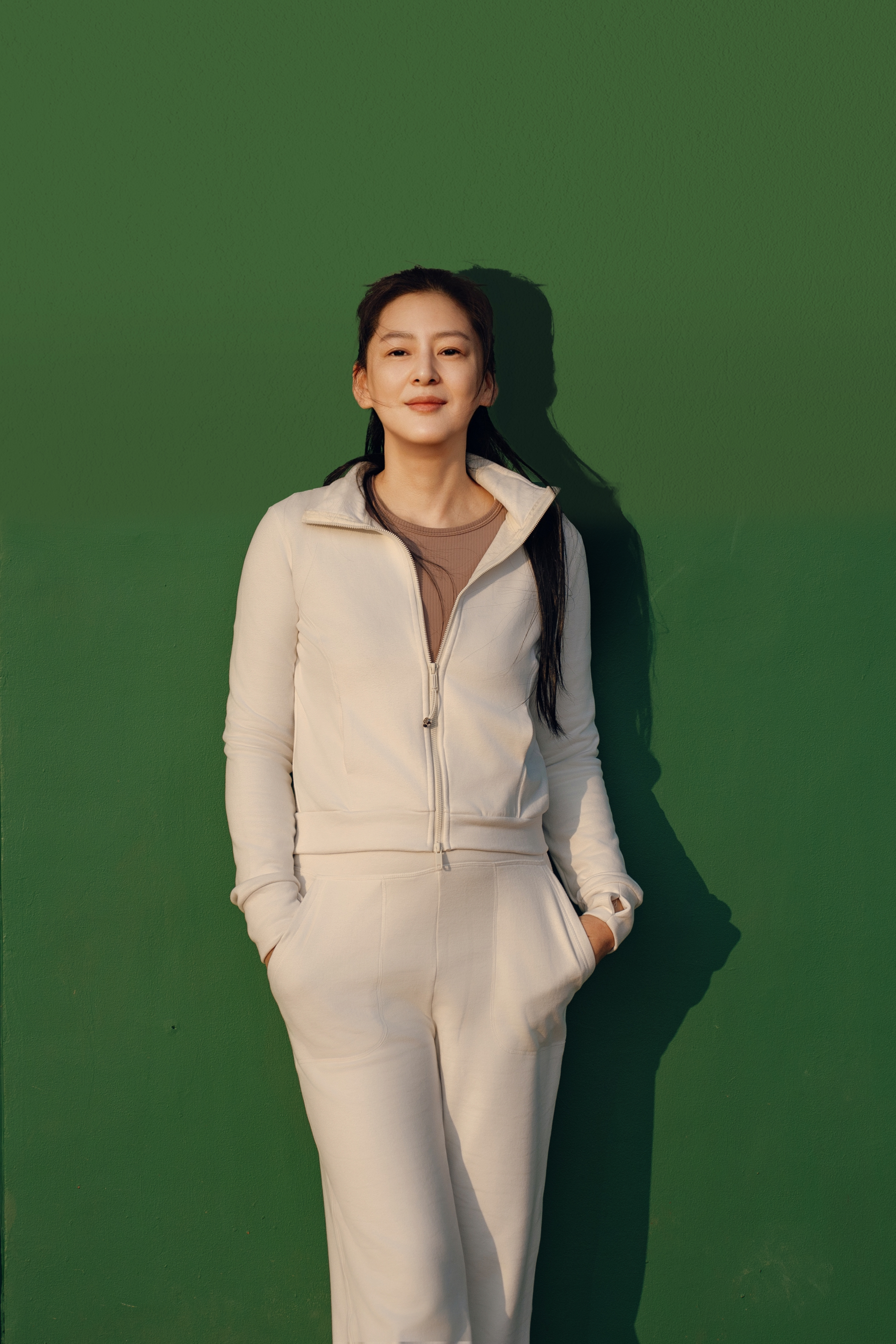
- Born: August 27, 1979 (age 46); Hangzhou, Zhejiang, China
- Occupation: Television producer
- Known for: If Life Cheats You, Tiger Mom, The Imperial Doctress, Ruyi's Royal Love in the Palace
- Children: 2
- Awards: Golden Oak Award for Outstanding Producer (2017); Top 10 Young Chinese TV Producers (2018)

Chinese name
- Chinese: 黄澜
Transcriptions
Standard Mandarin
- Hanyu Pinyin: Huáng Lán

Huang Lan (Chinese: 黄澜, born August 27, 1979) is a Chinese television producer. She became a partner on the dating show If You Are the One in 2016. Her notable works include The First Half of My Life, If life cheats you, Tiger Mom, The Imperial Doctress, and Ruyi's Royal Love in the Palace.

== Career ==
Huang produced the television series Hot Mom!, which premiered on September 14, 2013, followed by May December Love, which aired on February 16, 2014. In 2015, she produced Tiger Mom, which premiered on May 3 and earned her the Outstanding Producer Award at the 26th Zhejiang TV Peony Awards.

In 2017, Huang received the Golden Oak Award for Outstanding Producer at the American Asian Film Alliance Golden Oak Awards for her work on the television series The First Half of My Life, directed by Shen Yan. The series was a commercial success, achieving high ratings and widespread online popularity in China. It was later acquired by Fox Networks Group (FNG) for broadcast across Asia.

In 2018, Huang produced the historical drama Ruyi's Royal Love in the Palace, which premiered on August 20. The series marked a milestone as the first epic period drama for which FNG acquired global distribution rights outside mainland China; it has since aired in 18 countries and regions, including the United States, Canada, Australia, Japan, and the Philippines.

In 2022, two of Huang’s productions, Start Up Together and Master of My Own, premiered. That same year, she published her first essay collection, Live Up to Your Passion: Shine Your Light.

On May 4, 2023, Huang served as a guest judge at the awards ceremony of the 5th Meihodo International Youth Visual Media Festival.

In 2024, Huang produced Love Again, a lighthearted urban drama exploring romance and remarriage later in life. The series, produced by Tencent Video and starring Zhang Guoli, Tong Dawei, and Mei Ting, premiered on Tencent Video on March 30, 2025, and was simultaneously released on CCTV-8.

== Personal life ==
Huang is a mother of two children. Her academic background includes Russian and economics, which she studied from undergraduate through graduate school, in addition to her work in film and television.

== Filmography ==
=== As producer ===
- If Life Cheats You (2013)
- Hot Mom! (2013)
- May December Love (2014)
- Tiger Mom (2015)
- May–December Love 2 (2016)
- The Imperial Doctress (2016)
- The First Half of My Life (2017)
- Ruyi's Royal Love in the Palace (2018)
- Start Up Together (2022)
- Master of My Own (2022)
- Love Again (2025)

=== Television appearances ===
- If You Are the One（2016-）
- The First Half of My Life (2017)
- Ruyi's Royal Love in the Palace (2018)
- Start Up Together (2022)
- Master of My Own (2022)
- Love Again (2025)
