= I would rather cry in a BMW =

Quotation that became an online sensation

- Simplified Chinese: 宁在宝马车里哭，也不在自行车上笑
- Traditional Chinese: 寧在寶馬車裏哭，也不在自行車上笑
- Literal meaning: Rather inside BMW car crying, than be on top of a bike laughing
Transcriptions
Standard Mandarin
- Hanyu Pinyin: Níng zài Bǎomǎ chē lǐ kū, yě bùzài zìxíngchē shàng xiào

"I would rather cry in a BMW" is a quotation that became an online sensation in the People's Republic of China in 2010. The old, long-familiar phrase was made famous by Ma Nuo, a 20-year-old female contestant on the television dating show Fei Cheng Wu Rao (also known in English as If You Are the One). The line was in response to a question by an unemployed suitor who asked if Ma would "ride a bicycle with him" on a date. The series of events has been summed up in the media with the quip "I would rather cry in a BMW than smile on a bicycle."

== Author ==
In interviews after the show, Ma pointedly denied being a "gold digger", saying that she "just wanted to reject [her suitor] in a creative way." Social commentator Chen Zhigang remarked, "Does Ma Nuo only speak for herself? No. Her opinion resonates with youth; they have grown up in a society that is quickly accumulating material wealth. They worship money, cars and houses because the highly developed economy has made them do so."

== Analysis ==
The blunt nature of the statement works well in the dating show's format and is not the first controversial phrase to arise from Fei Cheng Wu Rao. Critics cited it as a window into the "degradation of Chinese social values," and even drew the attention of government censors, who eventually forced producers to redesign the show's format to be more professional and 'clean' of morally questionable content. The phrase also earned notoriety for Ma, whose purported pictures began surfacing all over the internet despite strong dislike from the public.

Professor Jinhua Zhao of the University of British Columbia referred to the quote to allude to trends in the last decade of Beijing residents opting to get rid of their bikes in favour of cars as a mode of transport, citing the social perception that "bikes are now for losers."

== See also ==
- List of Internet phenomena
