= Jin Xing =

Chinese ballerina, modern dancer, choreographer and actress

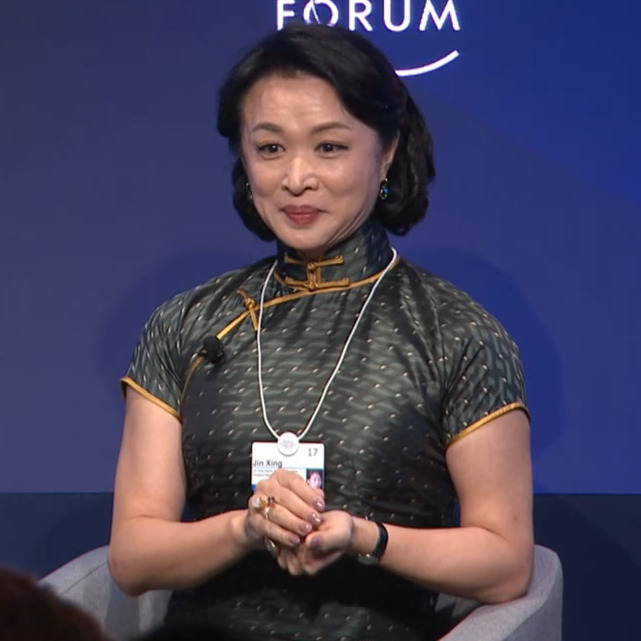
- Jin in 2017
- Born: Jin Xing; 13 August 1967 (age 59); Shenyang, Liaoning, China
- Citizenship: Chinese
- Occupations: Dancer; Choreographer; Television show host; Actress
- Years active: 1985–present
- Spouse: Heinz Gerd Oidtmann (m. 2005)
- Children: 3
- Dancing career
- Current group: Jin Xing Dance Theatre

Chinese name
- Chinese: 金星
Transcriptions
Standard Mandarin
- Hanyu Pinyin: Jīn Xīng

Chinese Korean name
- Chosŏn'gŭl: 김성
- Hancha: 金星
Transcriptions
- Revised Romanization: Gim Seong
- McCune–Reischauer: Kim Sŏng

Jin Xing (Chinese: 金星; pinyin: Jīn Xīng; Korean: 김성; born 13 August 1967) is a Chinese dancer, choreographer, TV personality, and actress. The most prominent openly transgender public figure in China, Jin is best known as a talent show judge and the host of The Jin Xing Show, though her visibility has been significantly curtailed by the Chinese government since 2021.

== Early life ==
Jin was born in 1967 in Shenyang, China, to a Chosŏnjok family. Her mother was a translator, and her father was a military intelligence officer.

Jin attended a Korean-language elementary school for Chosonjok Chinese. In her youth, she participated in abacus competitions and won multiple times. Passionate about dance, she joined the People’s Liberation Army at the age of nine to receive dance and military training with a troupe affiliated with the Shenyang Military Region. At twelve, she transferred to the People’s Liberation Army Art Academy, where she graduated in 1984. Following her graduation, she returned to the Shenyang military dance troupe and attained the rank of colonel. She later won a national dance competition with a Central Asian ethnic dance performance.

In 1989, Jin moved to New York on a scholarship to study modern dance for four years, training under pioneers such as Merce Cunningham and Martha Graham.

== Career ==
=== Dance ===
After her studies in New York, Jin traveled and performed in Europe, and taught dance in Rome and Belgium, followed by a world tour. She returned to China in 1993 and became one of the first individuals in the country to undergo sex reassignment surgery in 1995. Her left leg was paralyzed for three months after the surgery. In 1999, she opened China's first independent dance troupe, Jin Xing Dance Theater.

Jin's dancing works are described by the Encyclopedia of Contemporary Chinese Culture as "startlingly original and provocative." These include The Imperial Concubine Has Been Drunk for Ages (Guifei zui jiu, an adaptation of the famous Peking opera title) and Cross Border–Crossing the Line (Cong dong dao xi, a collaboration with British pianist Joanna MacGregor).

In 2024, the Jin Xing Dance Theater’s tour of the stage play Sunrise was canceled in several Chinese cities, effectively resulting in a ban on the theater in China.

=== Film and television ===
Her film debut was in the Korean movie Resurrection of the Little Match Girl in 2002. In 2005, she appeared in the Thai movie Tom-Yum-Goong as the villain Madame Rose.

In 2013, she began her television career as a judge on China's first season of So You Think You Can Dance. Jin went viral when she scathingly commented on the show's host's attempt to turn a contestant's injury into a sob story. She stated, "Chinese TV always digs at people's scars, consumes their pain. This is the biggest weakness of Chinese TV and I hate it! I hope that on 'So You Think You Can Dance' we won't use people's pain, we won't use people's sympathy, we won't use people's suffering." Audiences appreciated her raw honesty, and nine months later she had her own nationally broadcast show.

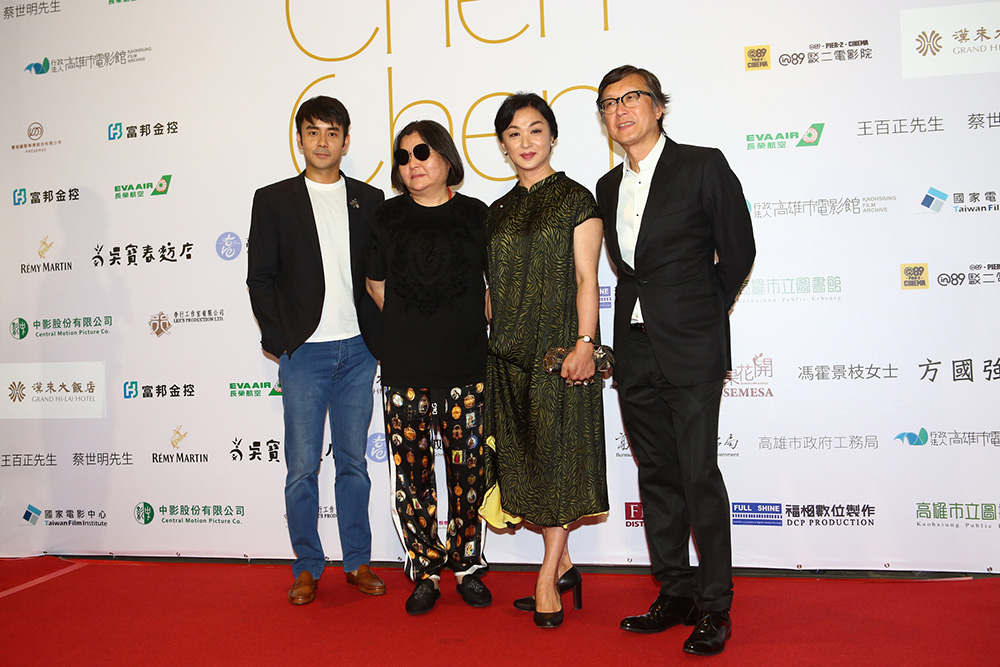
Jin in 2019

Jin hosted The Jin Xing Show on Dragon TV between 2015 and 2017. In 2016, she began hosting the dating show Chinese Dating with the Parents, where parents decide on a prospective wife for their sons. The show received criticism for portraying a conservative view on marriage and the role of women in the family. According to Vivian Wang and Joy Dong of The New York Times, Jin "bristles at being called a conservative. If she were a male chauvinist, she said, she would have continued living as a man." She has also advocated against gender discrimination in employment. Jin and her husband, Heinz Gerd Oidtmann, were contestants on The Amazing Race China 3 in 2016, where they finished 6th.

Since 2021, after a series of her shows were shut down or her credits erased, Jin has publicly protested against being discriminated against and censored by the authorities.

=== Other work ===
She participated in the Stock Exchange of Visions project in 2007.

In May 2021, she appeared in an advertising campaign for Dior to promote the empowerment and independence of women.

In March 2022, Jin criticized Vladimir Putin, President of Russia, on Weibo for launching a military invasion into Ukraine; her post was soon censored and her account muted.

== Personal life ==
When Jin was six years old, she went outside during a storm, hoping that "lightning would strike and transform her into a girl". She underwent sex reassignment surgery in 1995 in Beijing.

Jin has adopted 3 children. At the age of 33, Jin adopted a son and then two other children she raised by herself until her marriage in 2005. She married her German husband Heinz Gerd Oidtmann in 2005. She currently lives with her husband and children in Shanghai.

In addition to her native Chinese and Korean, she can speak English, Japanese, Italian, and French.

== Recognition ==
She was recognized as one of the BBC's 100 Women of 2017. Jin has been referred to as "China's Oprah Winfrey" by numerous Western media sources.

== Filmography ==
- Resurrection of the Little Match Girl (2002)
- Tom-Yum-Goong (2005)
- Birth of the Dragon (2016)
