= I Can See Your Voice (Chinese game show) =

Chinese television game show

- Simplified Chinese: 看见你的声音
- Hanyu Pinyin: Kàn jiàn nǐ de shēng yīn
- Genre: Game show
- Based on: I Can See Your Voice by CJ ENM
- Directed by: Zhou Hailiang
- Presented by: Mickey Huang; Li Hao; Shen Ling
- Starring: Bai Kainan; Deon Dai; Di Yang; Ava Shen; Mix; Xu Li
- Country of origin: China
- Original language: Mandarin
- No. of episodes: 12

Production
- Executive producer: Jun Kuanyi
- Camera setup: Multi-camera
- Production companies: Eslite Media; Hua Chuan Culture; Inly Media

Original release
- Network: JSTV
- Release: 27 March – 12 June 2016

Related
- I Can See Your Voice franchise

I Can See Your Voice (Chinese: 看见你的声音) is a Chinese television mystery music game show based on the South Korean programme of the same title, featuring its format where a guest artist attempts to eliminate bad singers from the group, until the last mystery singer remains for a duet performance. It premiered on JSTV on 27 March 2016.

== Gameplay ==
=== Format ===
Over the course of three rounds, the guest artist must attempt to eliminate bad singers from a group of "mystery singers", identified only by their occupation or alias, without ever hearing them perform live. They are assisted by clues regarding the singers' backgrounds, style of performance, and observations from a celebrity panel. At the end of a game, the last remaining mystery singer is revealed as either good or bad by means of a duet between them and one of the guest artists. (Note: Gameplay note: The number of mystery singers are set to six (episodes 7 and 9) or seven (for the rest of episodes).)

=== Rounds ===
1. Visual round
  The guest artist is given some time to observe and examine each mystery singer based on their appearance. Afterward, a muted video of each mystery singer that reveals only 0.3 seconds of their singing voice is played as an additional hint.
2. Lip sync round
  Each mystery singer performs a lip sync to a song; good singers mime to a recording of their own, while bad singers mime to a backing track by another vocalist.
3. Evidence round
  A proof of each mystery singer's singing ability (i.e. photo, video, certificates, etc.) is shown on the screen. Good singers have own evidences, while bad singers had their evidences fabricated.

== Production ==
In a joint agreement with CJ ENM, Chinese broadcaster Jiangsu Broadcasting Corporation formally acquired the rights to produce their first locally-licensed adaptation of I Can See Your Voice in June 2015, with Eslite Media, Hua Chuan Culture, and Inly Media co-assigning on production duties.

== Episodes ==
=== Guest artists ===
Legend:
Good singer
Bad singer

Episode		Guest artist (Note: Players' notes: For the returning guest artists (who also include foreigners and former good singers), names are displayed in italics.; For the mixed groups, names who identified as bad singers are displayed in italics.)	Mystery singers (In their respective numbers and aliases)						
#	Date	Guest artist	Elimination order						Winner
#	Date	Guest artist	Visual round		Lip sync round		Evidence round		Winner
1	27 March 2016	Fan Bingbing	2. Jing Jie (景洁)	5. He Yi (贺燚)	3. Garvey Jin (金泽)	6. (South Korea) Tony	4. Cao Rui (曹瑞)	1. Wang Yuankun (王圆坤)	7. Zhong Man (仲满)
2	3 April 2016	Han Geng	3. Nie Shi (聂诗) and Qi Junyu (齐浚羽)	6. Li Yuning (李禹凝)	2. Zhao Xieyu (赵阵雨)	4. Ye Liang-chen (叶良辰)	5. Zhai Huangying (寨黄莺)	7. Zhong Xingjiang (钟兴江)	1. Chen Sisi (陈思斯)
3	10 April 2016	Aska Yang (Note: Foreign guest artists: Hong Kong — Wong Cho-lam and Joey Yung; Malaysia — Gary Chaw; Taiwan — Aska Yang, Fei Yu-ching, Matilda Tao, Elva Hsiao, and Jolin Tsai)	2. Lin Xiaoke (林小可)	3. Jiang Ming-hong (蒋明宏)	5. Xu Xinling (徐欣玲)	6. Zeng Xuening (曾学宁)	1. Zeng Pengbiao (曾彭飚)	7. Li Bingbing (李冰冰)	4. Gu Linghe (顾凌赫)
4	17 April 2016	Gary Chaw	4. Yu Huan (郁欢)	5. Yang Sanjin (杨三金)	1. Deng Yuji (邓裕基)	2. Cao Zuyu (曹祖瑜)	3. Liu Kefu (刘可夫)	6. Wang Yue (王玥)	7. (Malaysia) Chuan Zhen Jun (蔡承俊)
5	24 April 2016	Fei Yu-ching	1. Aji Jirigala (阿吉·吉日嘎拉)	5. Zhou Wenyu (周文羽)	2. Zhong Ruixuan (钟瑞轩)	7. Niu Mengyao (牛梦瑶)	3. Zhang Mei'e (张美娥)	6. Lin Zhenyu (林振宇)	4. Yan Tianfeng (闫田峰)
6	1 May 2016	Wong Cho-lam	6. Bian Ruizhe (边瑞哲)	7. Gu Yuliang (顾玉亮)	1. Lou Kai (娄凯)	2. Ni Hongjie (倪虹洁)	3. Xiao Zhaogen (萧兆亘)	5. Zhang Yiwen (张艺雯)	4. (Spain) Marcelo
7	8 May 2016	Joker Xue	1. Zhang Jing (张婧)	2. Su Qianwei (苏倩薇)	4. (Russia) Nika	6. Wang Jiao (王娇)	5. Tian Rui (田蕊)		3. Zhang Huashuo (张华铄)
8	15 May 2016	Hua Chenyu	1. Wang Meng (王蒙)	6. Liu Shiyu (刘世宇)	2. Wu Youjun (吴宥俊)	4. (Singapore) Ian Fang (方伟杰)	5. Li Yiping (李一平)		3. Zhao Shengnan (赵胜男)
9	22 May 2016	Matilda Tao	3. Tang Hongpeng (唐鸿鹏)	5. Li Zhexi (李柘嘻)	1. Wu Ti (吾提)	4. Zhu Lei (朱雷)	2. Dannie Chen (陈丹妮)		6. Huang Dongjie (黄栋杰)
10	29 May 2016	Joey Yung	4. Hua Xi (花希)	6. Liu Dong (刘冬)	1. Zhang Xuege (张雪鸽)	3. An Ziyang (安子杨)	2. Wang Weihao (王维浩)	5. Ao Deng Gaowa (敖登高娃)	7. (Hong Kong) Matthew Ko (高钧贤)
11	5 June 2016	Elva Hsiao	1. Xu Zichao (徐子超)	6. Ma Shangshang (马上上)	2. Wang Weiwei (王玮玮)	5. Chen Xutong (陈叙潼)	4. Chen Duoduo (陈多多)	7. Isabelle Huang (黄龄)	3. Li Jinghua (李静华)
12	12 June 2016	Jolin Tsai	1. Mou Fengbin (牟凤彬)	4. Zheng Quanyu (郑权昱)	3. Zhang Chi (张驰)	6. Tang Yu-heng (唐钰恒)	2. Li Gen (李根)	7. He Zhiming (赫子铭)	5. Li Bo'er (李波儿)

=== Panelists ===
Legend:
Regular panelist
Additional panelist
Guest panelist

Apps		Panelists in attendance (Sorted by first appearance, with episode designations)
g#	p#	Panelists in attendance (Sorted by first appearance, with episode designations)
11	2	Xu Li (1–4, 6–12); Ava Shen (2–12)
10	1	Deon Dai (1–6, 9–12)
8	1	Di Yang (3–8, 11–12)
6	2	Bai Kainan (1–4, 7, 9); Mix (1–2, 5–6, 8, 12)
5	3	Kay Huang (Note: Panelists' note: Foreign attendees: Kay Huang, Aya Liu Huang Kuo-lun, and Nadow Lin (TWN)) (1, 3–4, 6–7); Aya Liu (1, 7–9, 12); Huang Kuo-lun (8–12)
4	1	Wang Yuexin (1–2, 7, 9)
3	1	Garvey Jin (1, 10–11)
2	2	KK (2–8); Nadow Lin (10–11)
1	9	Liu Yuxin (3); Zeng Pengbiao (4); Shen Ling, Zhang Chunye, and Wowkie Zhang (5); Cao Rui and Mickey Huang (6); He Jie (10); Liu Dun (12)
