= Chinese Dating with the Parents =

2016 Chinese TV series

- Season 1 titlecard
- Also known as: 中国新相亲 (New Chinese Blind Date) (Season 2)
- Chinese: 中国式相亲
- Hanyu Pinyin: Zhōng Guó Shì Xiāng Qīn
- Genre: Dating Show
- Presented by: Jin Xing (金星) (Season 1); Zhang Guoli (张国立) (Season 2); Chen Chen (陈辰) (Season 2)
- Country of origin: China
- Original language: Chinese
- No. of series: 2
- No. of episodes: 24

Production
- Production location: Shanghai
- Running time: 90 minutes

Original release
- Network: SMG: Dragon TV
- Release: 24 December 2016

Related
- If You Are the One (game show); Dating with the Parents

Zhong Guo Shi Xiang Qin (Chinese: 中国式相亲; lit. 'Chinese Style Blind Date', known in English as Chinese Dating with the Parents) is a Chinese companion dating show. It is made and broadcast on Dragon Television in China and is currently hosted by Zhang Guoli and Chen Chen. The program was first broadcast and released on 24 December 2016 (Christmas Eve 2016) on Saturday nights at 20:30, and was originally hosted by Jin Xing.

== Introduction and History ==
The show was first hosted by transgender woman Jin Xing (金星), who said that "Nowadays the social network are more lonely and less reliable, bringing their parents to find their companion for dating is the traditional way of Chinese people is it, for the first time in TV show." Jin Xing has revealed in 2017, she will serve as host on Dragon TV's Blind Date program Chinese Style Blind Date.

The show provides for young people to find the marriage opportunity, in depth communications between parents and children to achieve their parents desire for building an inter-generational relationship on platform, including discussions about inside and outside of emotional, inter-generational contradictions and social topics.

In the program show, candidates get the urge to marry from their parents who are either sitting on the stage and backstage for observation. The 5 groups of parents would sit behind each podium to face a single guest and compete for their favorite companion as they want, for their children or child sitting in the soundproof room.

== Premise ==
Every episode there would be 5 candidates with their parents on the program. The program alternates between a male version and a female version each week. After the introductions of each family, the children of the 5 groups of parents are sent to the soundproof room. A single candidate of the opposite gender then goes on stage one by one to the face the parents of the 5 candidates, whilst not being able to see the faces of their children

The single candidate then plays two videos to reveal information about themselves including their occupation and past relationships. During this time, the parents compete for the final 3 spots. In between the videos, the candidate, the parents and the host exchange banter with each other when videos are not shown. The children in the soundproof room are able to see the candidate through a separate screen and are also able to communicate with their parents through calling them on the phone in between videos.

After both videos have been shown, if the 3 finalist spots are not filled up, the host then asks the children in the soundproof room if they want their parents to join the other finalists. If the remaining children in the soundproof room (who are not finalists) chose not to join the finalists with their parents, the candidate leaves without a date.

If the candidate is successful in being able to get 3 groups of parents to fill up the three finalist spots, the candidate then puts forward a question to the three groups of parents from a set menu of queries. Following that, they are able to choose one of the children from the three groups of parents as their date.

== See also ==
- If You Are the One (game show)
