= Chen Chen (host) =

Chinese host and presenter

- Born: May 15, 1979 (age 46); Hangzhou, Zhejiang, China
- Occupations: Host, presenter
- Years active: 2002–present
- Spouse: Yu Di
- Children: 2

Chen Chen (Chinese: 陈辰; pinyin: Chén Chén; born May 15, 1979) is a Chinese host and presenter. She gained national prominence for hosting various popular programs on Dragon Television.

== Career ==
Chen was a child actress during her schooling years. Initially she had no intentions of entering the entertainment industry and worked as a host for small-scale product launches and promotional events to earn extra money as a university student. A television director who was at such an event persuaded her to try hosting a television program. She was chosen to host the children's program Dragon Club (小神龙俱乐部) as she was fluent in both English and Mandarin Chinese. After receiving a positive response from viewers, she hosted the SMG's flagship entertainment and lifestyle program Entertainment Online (娱乐在线).

Being bilingual, Chen has hosted and served as a translator at international events and conferences held in Shanghai, most notably the annual Shanghai International Film Festival. She co-hosted the 2015 Laureus World Sports Awards, which was held in Shanghai, together with actor Benedict Cumberbatch. The event drew much attention in China as Chen was the first Chinese national to host the awards and do it entirely in English without a translator.

Chen began shifting away from hosting television programs to producing in 2012. She was the producer and presenter of the critically-acclaimed program Heroes (闪亮的名字), which features the stories of ordinary citizens during significant periods of China's history, a departure from large-scale anniversary documentaries which typically glorified party or military achievements. The first season was nominated for Best Variety Program awards at the 2019 Shanghai Television Festival Magnolia Awards. Due to a positive reception from viewers, a second season was commissioned and it won the Best Literary/Cultural Program award at the biennial China Television Arts Starlight Awards.

== Personal life ==
Chen graduated from Shanghai International Studies University with a bachelor's degree in international journalism and master's degree in communication studies. She was exposed to the television and entertainment industry from an early age as her aunt Chen Peiying (陈佩英), better known by her stage name Xiao Chen (小辰), was a presenter and producer during the 1960s to 1980s.

Chen has two children with her husband Yu Di, a singer-songwriter, musical actor and vocal instructor at Shanghai Theatre Academy. The couple had kept their relationship and marriage a secret until January 2019 when she appeared in the audience of the singing competition Super-Vocal season 1, in which her husband was a participant, and was subsequently revealed as his wife.

== Filmography ==
Year	English title	Chinese title	Notes
2002	Dragon Club	小神龙俱乐部	Host
2002	Entertainment Online	娱乐在线	Host
2003	Star Space	娱乐星天地	Host
2004	My Show	我型我秀	Host
2006–2007	My Hero	加油！好男儿	Host
2006	Let's Shake It	舞林大会	Contestant
2007		非常有戏	
2009		闪电星感动	
2009		天裁爱美丽	
2011		谁是大人物	
2012	Chen Chen's All Stars	陈辰全明星	Host
2012	XXS-OMG We Became Smaller	天哪！我们变小啦！	Host
2018–2019	Chinese Dating with the Parents	中国新相亲	Co-host; 2 seasons
2019–2020	Heroes	闪亮的名字	Host and producer 2 seasons
2022-2023	Future China	未来中国	Co-host
