= If You Are the One (game show) =

Chinese dating game show

- Logo
- Also known as: 缘来非诚勿扰 (Yuan Lai Fēi Chéng Wù Rǎo)
- 非诚勿扰
- Genre: Dating Show
- Based on: Taken Out
- Presented by: Host: Meng Fei (孟非); Guest Speakers: Le Jia (乐嘉); Huang Han (黄菡); Zeng Zihang (曾子航); Ning Caishen (宁财神); Tong Dawei (佟大为); Huang Lei (黄磊); Huang Lan (黄澜) (incumbent); Jiang Zhenyu (姜振宇); Chen Ming (陈铭) (incumbent)
- Country of origin: China
- Original language: Mandarin
- No. of episodes: 616 (original)

Production
- Producer: JSBC
- Production location: Nanjing, China
- Running time: 90 minutes

Original release
- Network: JSBC: Jiangsu Television
- Release: 15 January 2010 – 25 March 2017
- Release: 13 May 2017 – 28 December 2019
- Release: 4 January 2020 – present

Related
- Chinese Dating with the Parents; Dating with the Parents

Fei Cheng Wu Rao (simplified Chinese: 非诚勿扰; traditional Chinese: 非誠勿擾; pinyin: Fēi Chéng Wù Rǎo; lit. 'Serious Inquiries Only', also broadcast with the titles If You Are the One in Australia and Perfect Match in Malaysia) is a Chinese dating game show hosted by Meng Fei. Loosely based on the Taken Out format, the show is produced by JSBC: Jiangsu Television and taped in Nanjing. It was first broadcast on January 15, 2010, and originally aired twice a week on Saturdays and Sundays until December 2014. From January 2015 to March 2017, it aired on Saturday nights at 9:10 pm on Jiangsu TV. Starting from January 2018 onwards, it airs on Saturday nights at 8:30 pm.

If You Are the One has been a ratings success in China and is now the highest-rated show for Jiangsu TV. Episodes are also widely distributed online. The show is viewed internationally over the internet and satellite television. The show's popularity and social commentary has drawn the attention of academics and foreign media, and after concerns from Chinese regulators in 2011 the show's format was tweaked to de-emphasize factors such as financial wealth.

After a short break from March 2017 to May 2017, If You Are the One returned in a revised format.

In December 2019, it was announced that If You Are the One would return to the original format in January 2020 for the 10th anniversary celebrations. Huang Han and Huang Lei returned for the celebratory episodes, whilst Chen Ming was announced as Jiang Zhenyu's guest speaker replacement for the 2020 season, following the end of the revised 2017 format.

== History ==
=== Conception and popularity ===
“If You Are the One" is currently the most-viewed dating show in the Chinese-speaking world. According to Beijing-based CSM Media Research, the audience ratings for Fei Cheng Wu Rao - which as of May 22, 2013 had screened a total of 343 episodes - were 2.77 percent of television viewers, or 36 million, twice as many as the nearest competitor for that timeslot.

The idea of the show was brought to Jiangsu Television by veteran television producer Wang Peijie, who worked in collaboration with Columbia University-educated Xing Wenning. The pair drew inspiration from the Taken Out format, however when the rights for that show were instead won by a rival network, If You Are the One was launched instead. Wang said that the show is a window into Chinese society at large, and that through it, "you can tell what China is thinking about and chasing after." The show's focus was intended to be young professionals. While most of the contestants are in their twenties, there have been instances of male contestants as old as 48 appearing on the show.

If You Are the One experienced great popularity in its first broadcast because of its unique approach to dating and the conversations that are often humorous with friendly insults. The show sought to 'stretch the limits' of what could be discussed on Chinese television. Unlike Taken Out, If You Are the One does not rely on audience participation, use of catchphrases or physical attractiveness among male contestants. Also, different from dating shows in the late 1990s, such as The Rose which mainly discussed private matters such as personality and hobbies, If You Are the One engages more with larger socioeconomic issues such as pre-marriage property notarization and gender equality.

=== Controversy and revisions ===
In the first half of 2010, the show broke ratings records, with some 50 million watching every episode, an audience second only to the CCTV evening news broadcast Xinwen Lianbo. In the initial format of the show, the contestants reported things such as their annual earnings, their material possessions, etc. During this phase several contestants earned notoriety and became internet sensations. Female contestant Ma Nuo became a media interest after her controversial remarks to a male contestant that she would "prefer to cry in a BMW" than laugh riding on the back of a bicycle. One male contestant, a son of a businessman, was rejected by all 24 women on one episode for egregiously showing off his sports cars and bank statements instead of his life and interests. There have been three different male contestants who have lost the show in the beginning when the female contestants first study the male. Both controversial contestants were some of the most-talked-about people in Chinese entertainment. In addition, concerns were raised that some of the contestants on the show were not who they said they were, and that the TV station was 'planting' contestants to make controversial remarks to increase ratings.

Chinese authorities looked upon the show unfavourably, asserting that it was spreading the 'wrong values' and 'advocating materialism'. State media editorialized against the show on television, in print, and online. Six months after the show first aired, officials from the State Administration of Radio, Film and Television stepped in to regulate the show. SARFT issued two Notifications to standardize Chinese reality TV shows, urging the shows to recall social responsibilities and promoting traditional Chinese virtues. From that point forward, Fei Cheng Wu Rao was to curb mentions of financial wealth and sex, and a third host was added: a party school psychology teacher named Huang Han, who was seen to 'balance' the show to make it more grounded and less controversial as well as adding more banter between the three hosts. A wholesale replacement of the contestant pool with more tame individuals followed. The revised program scrubbed contestant information such as bank account information and salaries, etc. Also omitted is the 'final opinions' on a departing male contestant from the women; previously this part of the show was especially prone to pointed insults and ridicule. Moreover, the original reel of the show must undergo heavy editing before airing depending on length and number of contestants present. Despite the changed format, the show remains extremely popular.

=== 2016 revision ===
In January 2016, as a result of a Chinese judge ruling that the show's name "Fei Cheng Wu Rao" infringed another individual's copyright who owned the same name as the show, the producers temporarily changed the name of the show to "Yuan Lai Fei Cheng Wu Rao" (although the English name seems to have stayed the same). Jiangsu Television station has promised to appeal the ruling.

Between November 19 to December 10, 2016, a series of specials titled "1vs24" was aired where the roles of the genders were reversed with 24 Males taking to the podiums to face a single female. The gameplay of the special episodes was the same as the normal episodes. Another series of 1vs24 specials was aired between March 4 to March 25, 2017.

On December 31, 2016, the Guangdong High Court overturned the decision on appeal by ruling that "Fei Cheng Wu Rao" did not infringe on another individual's copyrights and therefore the producers changed the name of the show back to "Fei Cheng Wu Rao".

=== 2017 revision ===
On April 1, 2017, Jiangsu Television announced that the final episode of If You Are The One in the original format had aired on March 25 with the filming of shows suspended since January, announcing a temporary suspension of the show as it undergoes reformatting for a relaunch late in May. Meng Fei continued to be the host of the revised format of the show. Jiang Zhenyu became the guest speaker. The revised version was first aired on May 13, 2017.

=== 2018 ===
The 2018 version was first aired on January 6, 2018. On February 3, 2018, Huang Lan returned to the show as female commentator, partnering with Jiang Zhenyu.

=== 2020-present ===
The 2020 version was first aired on January 4, 2020 and celebrates 10 years of If You Are the One. The show returned to the original format for 2020 onwards, after 3 years under the 2017 revised format. Chen Ming partnered as the male commentator with Huang Lan. Former guest Huang Han joined in during the special edition aired between January 4, 2020 to January 18, 2020. A new addition, “智推女生” or "Recommended Lady", was introduced in this version, purported to use big data and artificial intelligence to recommend the best match for the single man. The best match is calculated during the first segment and unveiled during the last segment.

== Premise ==
=== 2010 and 2020 edition ===
Twenty-four women stand in an arc, each behind a podium with a light that they initially turn on. Between 28 March 2020 and 25 April 2020, due to the COVID-19 pandemic, the number of women was reduced to twelve for safe-distancing purposes.

The women face a single man, who chooses one of them as his "heartbeat girl" (simplified Chinese: 心动女生) from sight alone before any conversation between the women and the single man has taken place. The option for the “heartbeat girl” to be picked randomly is also available to the man, should he choose to have her picked this way. His choice of "heartbeat girl" is initially known only to himself and the host of the programme - although there has been one instance where this has been revealed soon after.

The single man uses two or three video clips to reveal some personal information such as occupation, interests, love history and friends' opinions. During each video clip, each of the women decides whether or not he is still "date-worthy" in her opinion by keeping her light on or turning it off. The contestants, psychologists and host frequently exchange banter with each other when video clips aren't being shown.

If a girl doesn't like the man, she will turn her light off (followed by a sound cue).

A new procedural option, "burst light" (simplified Chinese: 爆灯), enabling a woman to signal a special interest in the man, was introduced to the programme in the episode broadcast on 20 October 2012. It can be activated only once per round, and is heralded by a "smashing" sound cue, followed by a show of pulsating hearts, along with the number of the woman who "burst the light", on display screens around the studio. It is essentially the opposite of turning the podium light off; instead, a woman who "bursts the light" is choosing to signal her interest in the man demonstratively rather than just passively leaving her light on. If a woman has activated the "burst light", her light cannot be turned off; instead, her light changes to a pulsating heart display in the 2010 version, or a flashing yellow light in the 2020 version, and she is guaranteed a place as a finalist at the end of the round.

If, after all the videos have been played, there are more than two girls still with their lights on, the man goes and turns off some of those lights, choosing only two of the remaining girls to come up on the stage as finalists. After that, the identity of the man's "heartbeat girl" is revealed. She too is invited onto the stage (if not already there) as a finalist.

If a woman has activated the "burst light", she is invited onto the stage as a finalist. In the 2010 version, this occurs before the two remaining girls come up on the stage as finalists. In the 2020 version, the "burst light" girl is counted as one of the two remaining girls for when the man goes to turn off excess lights, and for when the girls come up on the stage as finalists.

In the 2020 version, the "Recommended Lady" (simplified Chinese: 智推女生) is then revealed, as long as at least one girl keeps her light on. She too is invited onto the stage (if not already there) as a finalist.

In all circumstances, there can end up being two, three or four women on the stage as finalists. If there is one girl remaining, she remains in her podium, and in the 2020 version, the "Recommended Lady" also remains in her podium in this instance.

The man puts to the finalists a question that he chooses from a set menu of queries. Following that, he can put to the finalists an original question of his own. After that, if one of the finalists had "burst the light", she is given an opportunity to explain her interest in the man and why she should be chosen.

If the man elects to take one of the finalists who had shown interest in him (i.e. hadn't turned her light off), he walks to her, takes her hand, and they depart for a presumed future date.

The man may insist on his "heartbeat girl", or in the 2020 version, choose his "Recommended Lady", even if they had turned their lights off. In these cases, the other finalists are dismissed back to their podiums, and the man is given an opportunity to win his choice of girl over. She may accept him as her date and depart with him, or reject him and return to her podium.

Occasionally, a man elects to choose none of the finalists and to depart alone.

The post-game interview appears with the man alone, or with him and his chosen girl if he is "successful".

=== 2017 edition ===
The single man divides twenty-four women into two groups of twelve, the "favourites" group and the "observation" group, prior to starting the conversation between the women and the single man. The women strut down the runway to the large screen, and are not able to see the single man while he is selecting his groups on a tablet. Once a group is full, the last remaining women go to the other group by default. Taking too long to make a decision (timing-out) would result in a woman going to the “observation” group by default. The host and the single man then begins conversation with the women behind the screen after the selection process has taken place, followed by playing his first video.

After the first round of conversation has taken place between the single man and women, the host notifies the single man to select his first finalist. The man is able to choose any girl from both zones, and his selection is revealed to the women shortly after selection. The selected woman is then asked to proceed to the gold finalist podiums. Prior to the reveal of the single man to the women, the screen shows chronological photos of the single man starting from his childhood, before the screen raises up to reveal his full body, where he then introduces himself to the women.

The single man uses a total of two video clips to reveal some personal information such as occupation, interests and love history. During each video clip, each of the women from the favourites group decide whether or not he is still "date-worthy" in their opinion by keeping their light on or turning it off, or for the women in the observation group, adjusting their thermometers to measure their interest in the single man. Before the second video clip is shown, the host notifies the single man to select his second finalist, again from either zone, which his selection is revealed to the women shortly after. The second selected woman is then asked to join the other finalist on the gold podiums. The contestants, guests and host frequently exchange banter with each other when video clips aren't being shown.

If a girl in the favourites group doesn’t like the man, she will turn her light off (followed by a sound cue). The girls in the observation group may use their thermometers to measure their interest in the single man.

If, after both videos have been played, if there is still at least one girl from the favourites group still with their light on, the man can elect to either swap one of the finalists for one of the girls from the favourites group with her light still on, or to keep the initially selected girls on the gold podiums as finalists. The man puts to the finalists a question that he chooses from a set menu of queries, followed by putting forward a question of his own.

If the single man had chosen to keep the initial two finalists selected during the final questions round, the host asks the single man to choose a preferred finalist to take. This is followed by the host revealing separately whether the finalists had kept their light on for the single man during the round. If his preferred girl from the final two had kept her light on, the single man leaves with the girl. If his preferred girl had turned off her light, the man leaves the stage alone. If the single man had chosen to swap out one of the finalists for one of the girls that had kept their light on in the favourites section during the round, and decides to choose the woman that was swapped into the finalists podiums after the final question round, he is able to walk to her, take her hand and leave together for a presumed future date.

If all the girls in the favourites group had turned their lights off at the end of the round, the host bypasses the question round and goes directly to the finalists decision by revealing to the single man whether both finalists had kept their light on during the round. If it is revealed that one or both finalists had kept their light on for the man, it is up to the man to choose whether to leave with one of the finalists. If it has been revealed that both finalists had their lights off, the man leaves the stage alone.

Occasionally, a man elects to choose none of the finalists and departs alone.

The post-game interview appears with the man alone, or with him and his chosen girl if he is "successful". Matched couples are also awarded a cruise to Japan.

== Songs featured on the show ==
=== 2010 and 2020 edition ===
The girls make their entrance:

- In the 2020 version, to Little Mix's "Wings".
- In the 2010 version, to Jessie J, Ariana Grande and Nicki Minaj's "Bang Bang".
  Previous songs on this version included Avril Lavigne's "Girlfriend", and Madonna's "Give Me All Your Luvin'".
- In the "1vs24" episodes of the 2010 version, the guys make their entrance to Korean boy band Big Bang's "Fantastic Baby".

In both versions, the introduction song when a contestant enters the stage is Jean-Roch's "Can You Feel It" (Big Ali Edit).

In both versions, if the contestant has 0/24 lights left, Carl Orff's "O Fortuna from Carmina Burana" plays.

If the contestant leaves without a date, they leave:

- In the 2020 version, to Fish Leong's ('可惜不是你') "Sadly, it's not you" (also previously used in the 2010 version).
- In the 2010 version, to Eason Chan's (陈奕迅) "Eliminate" ("淘汰") or Hebe Tien's ('寂寞寂寞 就好') "Leave Me Alone".
  Previous songs on this version included Fish Leong's ('可惜不是你') "Sadly, it's not you", and A-Lin's ('離開的時候') "Time to leave".

If the contestant has more than 2 lights left on after the final round and has to turn off excess lights (Candidate's Choice), they do so:

- In the 2020 version, to an electric guitar riff track.
- In the 2010 version, to "Beginner" by Japanese girl group AKB48.

In the 2010 version:

- When the burst light girl walks the catwalk, the song "Hush" by Korean girl group Miss A (미쓰에이) plays. This was formerly "I LOVE YOU" by 2NE1.
- In the "1vs24" episodes, when the burst light guy walks the catwalk, the song "Moves like Jagger" by American band Maroon 5 plays.

When two finalist girls (which may include the burst light girl in the 2020 version) walk the catwalk, they do so:

- In the 2020 version, to "I Really Like You" by Canadian singer Carly Rae Jepsen.
- In the 2010 version, to "Gee" by Korean girl group Girls' Generation (소녀시대).
- In the "1vs24" episodes of the 2010 version, when two finalist guys walk the catwalk, the song "Sugar" by American band Maroon 5 plays.

If the favorite girl, or in the case of the "1vs24" episodes in the 2010 version, the favorite guy, is not one of the two finalists, they will walk down the catwalk:

- In the 2020 version, to Korean girl group Blackpink's "Ddu-Du Ddu-Du".
- In the 2010 version, to a swing beat track.

In the 2020 version, when the "Recommended Lady" walks the catwalk, "There for You" by Martin Garrix and Troye Sivan plays.

If the two female finalists are not chosen (i.e. the contestant insists on the favorite girl, or the "Recommended Lady" in the 2020 version), they leave the stage:

- In the 2020 version, to Ariana Grande and Zedd's "Break Free".
- In the 2010 version, to "Real Man" (大丈夫) by Taiwanese pop singer Jolin Tsai (蔡依林). The previous song on this version was formerly "Goodbye bye bye" by Elva Hsiao (蕭亞軒).
- In the "1vs24" episodes of the 2010 version, if the two male finalists are not chosen (i.e. the contestant insists on the favorite guy), "Good Boy" by Korean duo GD X Taeyang plays.

In both versions, a matched couple leave to the tune of "You're The Right One" (“你是对的人”) by Lee Junho (이준호) featuring Qi Wei (戚薇).
Previous songs on the 2010 version included:

- "Finally waited for you" ("終於等到你") by Jane Zhang (張靚穎)
- "Liang Shanbo and Juliet" ("梁山伯与朱丽叶") by Genie Chuo (卓文萱) featuring Gary Cao (曹格)
- "Beautiful Love" by Tanya Chua (蔡健雅 )
- "Romance" by Jiang Yu Chen (江語晨)
- "Everybody" by Ingrid Michaelson

In both versions, the outro song with the credits is "One Step Forward" (往前一步) by Meng Fei.

An alternative outro in the 2010 version features the song Wo Zai Na Yi Jiao Luo Huan Guo Shang Feng" (我在那一角落患过伤风(小说音乐)) by Fiona Fung.

=== 2017 edition ===
The introduction song when a contestant divides the twenty-four women as they make their entrance is Martin Jensen's "Solo Dance".

When a finalist is selected or swapped, they walk to the gold finalist podium to Redfoo's "New Thang".

The contestant introduces himself to the women as the screen rises up to Jean-Roch's "I See Your Light".

If the contestant leaves without a date, they leave to Yoga Lin (林宥嘉)'s "Shadow of Your Back" ("背影").

A matched couple leave to the tune of Silence Wang (汪苏泷) and By2's "A Bit Sweet" ("有點甜").

The outro song with the credits is "One Step Forward" (往前一步) by Meng Fei.

== Guests ==
If You Are The One has had many guests through its long history. They include:

=== Male guest ===
- Le Jia (From 15 Jan 2010 to 14 Oct 2012 and from 18 Nov 2012 to 31 Mar 2013)
- Zeng Zihang (From 13 Apr 2013 to 13 Jul 2013)
- Ning Caishen (From 14 July 2013 to 26 Jan 2014, from 15 Feb 2014 to 1 Mar 2014 and from 9 Mar 2014 to 22 Jun 2014)
- Tong Dawei (From 9 Aug 2014 to 24 Aug 2014 and from 13 Sep 2014 to 18 Oct 2014)
- Huang Lei (From 19 Oct 2014 to 1 Nov 2014, from 16 Nov 2014 to 28 Mar 2015, from 1 Aug 2015 to 25 March 2017 and 4 January 2020)
- Jiang Zhenyu (2017 format guest speaker) (From 13 May 2017 to 28 December 2019)
- Chen Ming (From 4 January 2020 to 29 February 2020, 23 May 2020 to present)

=== Female guest ===
- Huang Han (27 June 2010 to 18 July 2010, 7 August 2010 to 16 October 2011, 6 November 2011 to 19 March 2016, from 13 May 2017 to 3 June 2017, 4 January 2020 to 18 January 2020, 28 March 2020 to 16 May 2020)
- Huang Lan (26 Mar 2016 to 25 March 2017, 3 Feb 2018 to 29 February 2020, 23 May 2020 to current)

=== Fill-in Male guests ===
- Yu Zheng (6 & 7 April 2013, 1 week)
- Zhang Jiajia (2 & 8 Mar 2014, 1 week; 13 Jul 2014 to 3 Aug 2014, 3 weeks and 24 December 2016)
- Hawick Lau (From 30 Aug 2014 to 7 Sep 2014, 2 weeks)
- Zhang Liang (From 2 Nov 2014 to 15 Nov 2014, 2 weeks)
- Liu Ye (From 4 Apr 2015 to 23 May 2015, 8 episodes)
- Lu Yi (From 30 May 2015 to 25 Jul 2015, 8 episodes)
- Tu Lei (Spring Special) (14 February 2021)

=== Fill-in Female guest ===
- Huang Shengyi (Spring Special) (14 February 2021)

== International broadcast ==
- Malaysia - NTV7 broadcast the programme from 6:30pm to 8:00pm on every Sunday under the English title, Perfect Match.
- Australia - SBS Viceland - Starting from 2013, the network (previously SBS 2) had previously broadcast an edited 60 minute version of the programme from 6:00pm to 7:00pm on Friday nights, and before that on Saturday nights under the title If You Are the One, with English subtitles provided by SBS, until it was removed from broadcast due to declining ratings in April 2020. However, from 5 March – 14 May 2021, SBS resumed broadcasting the final episodes of the 2017 revised format, from Series 11, Episode 40 to Episode 51.

== See also ==
- "I would rather cry in a BMW"
- O Fortuna
