= Alfred Böning =

Alfred Böning (1907-1984) was the chief engineer at BMW in the 1930s who was responsible for designing many iconic BMW motorcycles and motorcars. He reigned over the BMW design studio as a chief engineer before being replaced by chief engineer Fritz Fiedler and was promoted to become head of the automotive drawing office. Among his designs were the legendary 1934 BMW R7 motorcycle, that never saw the light of the day.

== Designs ==
He was credited with either designing of corroborating in design for several early BMW automobile models including the BMW 3/20, BMW 326, BMW 328, and the BMW 331.
