= BMW 321 =

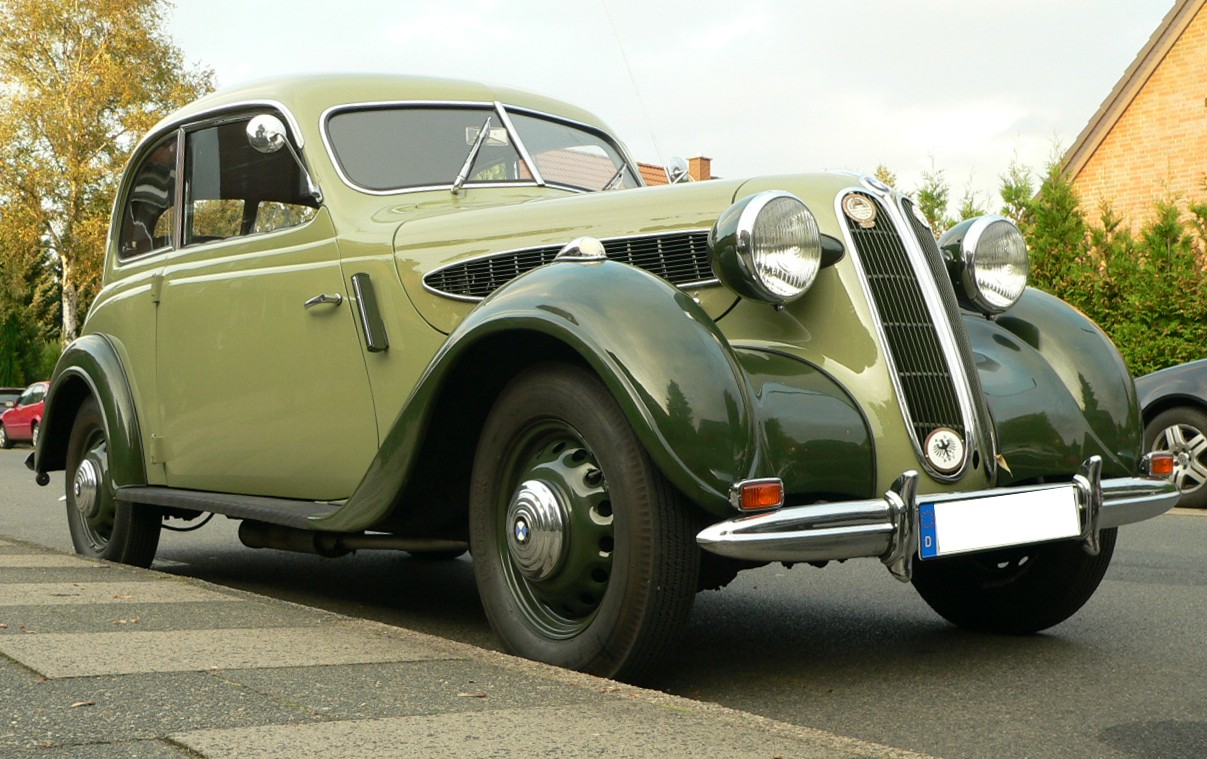
- BMW 321 2-door saloon

Overview
- Manufacturer: Bayerische Motoren Werke AG (BMW); Sowjetische AG Maschinenbau Awtowelo
- Production: 1938–1941 (3,814 built); 1945–1950 (8,996 built)
- Assembly: Germany: Eisenach (1938–1941); Soviet occupation zone in Germany and East Germany: Eisenach (1945–1950)

Body and chassis
- Class: Mid-size car
- Body style: 2-door saloon 2-door cabriolet
- Layout: FR layout
- Related: BMW 326; BMW 320; BMW 340

Powertrain
- Engine: 1,971 cc (120.3 cu in) M78 I6
- Transmission: 4-speed manual

Dimensions
- Wheelbase: 2,750 mm (108 in)
- Length: 4,500 mm (180 in)
- Width: 1,540 mm (61 in)
- Height: 1,500 mm (59 in)
- Curb weight: 1,000 kg (2,200 lb) (measurements approximate)

Chronology
- Predecessor: BMW 320
- Successor: BMW New Class

The BMW 321 is a compact six-cylinder automobile produced by the Bavarian firm between 1938 and 1941. After 1945, production of the 321 resumed at the Eisenach plant and continued until 1950.

== The launch ==
The 321 was introduced at the start of 1939 as a successor to the BMW 320. It sat on a shortened version of the BMW 326 chassis. The 321 differed from the 320 in its front suspension, its larger tyres, and its styling. While the 320 used front suspension derived from the BMW 303, with a high mounted transverse leaf spring and lower control arms, the 321 used the front suspension from the 326, with upper control arms and a low mounted transverse leaf spring.

== Body options ==
The car was available both as a two-door sedan and as a two-door cabriolet. In addition, BMW offered a chassis-only option suitable for a coach-built body.

== Engine and transmission ==
The 1971 cc straight 6 M78 engine was based on the engine in the BMW 326 with a claimed power output of 45 PS (33 kW; 44 hp) and maximum speed of 115 km/h (71 mph). The four-speed manual gear box was also the one already seen on the 326.

== Commercial ==
Two years after the introduction of the 321, in 1941, automobile production at the Eisenach plant was suspended in favour of war production. By then, 3,814 had been built.

== Production after World War II ==
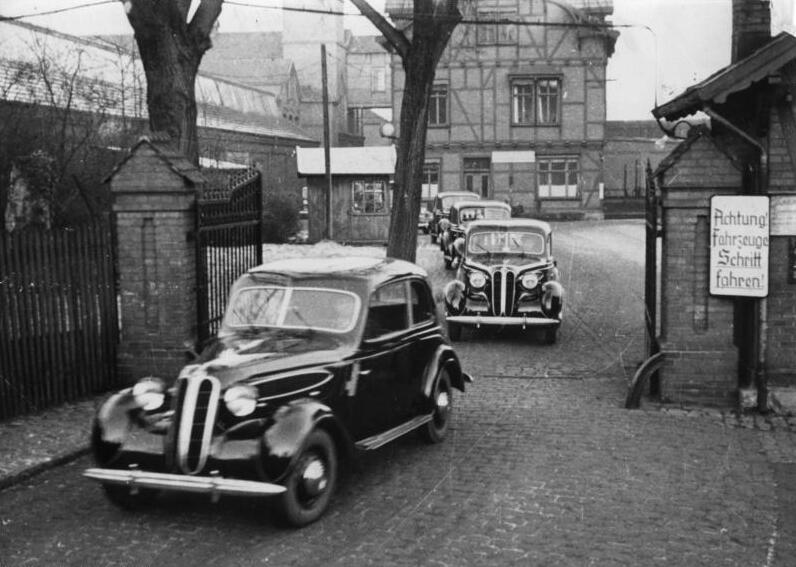
In 1948 the first batch of postwar BMW 321s allocated for "civilian use" was photographed leaving the Eisenach plant. The batch was of just fifteen cars.

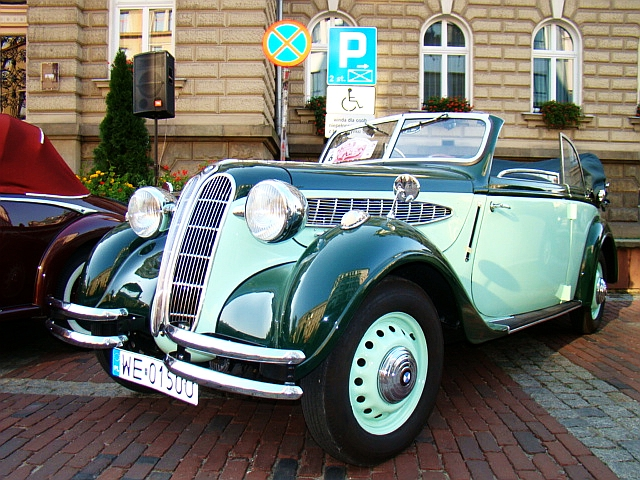
BMW 321 cabriolet

In April 1945, Eisenach was occupied by American forces, but by then it had already been agreed between the allies that the whole of Thuringia would fall within the Soviet occupation zone: transfer of the region to the Soviets took place in July 1945. The tooling for BMW's manufacturing facility had been hidden in nearby mines during the war, but the entire operations were intended to be crated up and taken by rail to the Soviet Union as part of the substantial post war reparations package. In the meantime, surviving workers returning from the war recommenced automobile production, on a very small scale, using prewar designs. Albert Seidler, the man in charge of Eisenach motor bike production, had a brand new 321 (with red seats) assembled and presented it to Marshal Georgy Zhukov. The Russians were evidently impressed, and agreed to halt dismantling the plant if the workers were able to assemble five more cars in one week. Zhukov issued order no. 93 in October 1945, agreeing to have finished cars sent to the Soviet Union as part of the reparations package rather than the plant itself. Ten cars (and 23 motorcycles) were compled that very month. The plant then passed under the control of "Sowjetische AG Maschinenbau Awtowelo", a Soviet directed holding company focused on vehicle production.

Initial production was reserved for the Soviet Union and government use; production for civilian use and commercial exports commenced in 1948. A further 8,996 BMW 321s are thought to have been built between 1945 and 1950. Most appear to have remained to the east of the Iron Curtain. Evidence also exists for exports to the west: the car was advertised in Switzerland in 1949 with a retail price of CHF 10,300.
