= Fritz Fiedler =

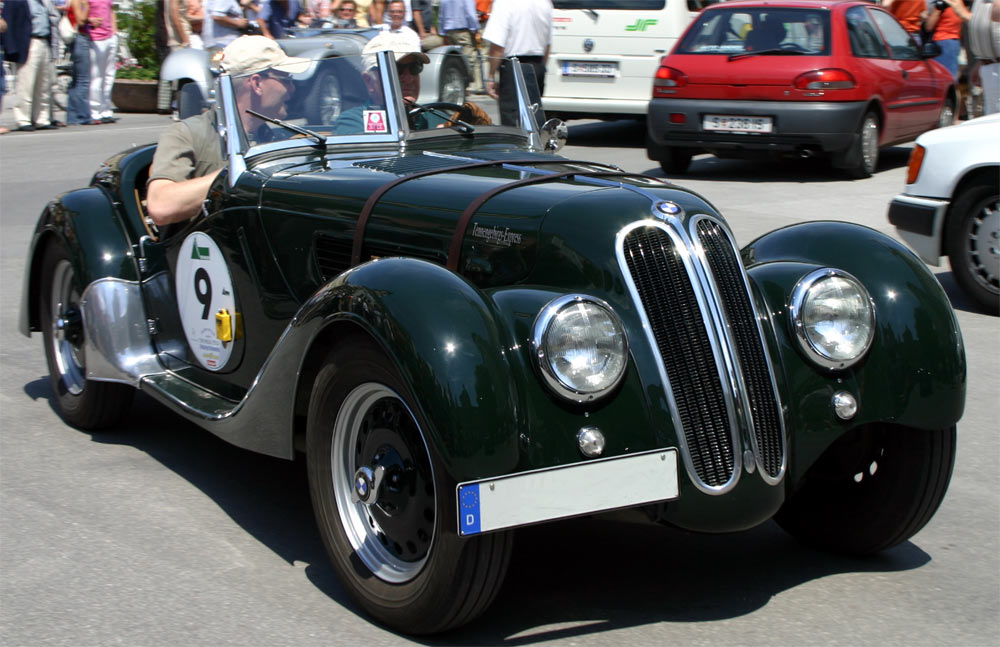
Fiedler led the engineering team that designed the legendary BMW 328 sports car introduced in 1936...

Fritz Fiedler (born Potsdam 9 January 1899: died Schliersee 8 July 1972), was an automotive engineer. His projects included the BMW 328 sports car, the ex-BMW Bristol straight-six engine, and the BMW New Class sedan.

== Career to 1945 ==
Fiedler began his career in engineering at Stoewer and moved to Horch in 1924, where he eventually became chief engineer. He designed 8-cylinder and 12-cylinder cars at Horch. He left in 1932 when Horch became part of Auto Union. He then went to BMW on the recommendation of his former assistant Rudolf Schleicher, who had joined Horch from BMW in 1927 and returned to BMW in 1931. Fiedler became chief engineer at the age of 32 over former chief engineer Alfred Böning who became head of the automotive drawing office.

In 1933 Fiedler was given the project to design the M78 six-cylinder engine for the BMW 303. The first car that Fiedler was fully responsible for was the BMW 326 saloon that was shown at the International Automobile Ausstellung in Berlin in 1936.

While Schleicher was at Munich on motorcycle development and the competition side of BMW motor car activity, Fiedler was at Eisenach in overall command of the car side of BMW, specialising in chassis, suspension and aerodynamic design and development. His last automotive design from Eisenach was the 3.5-litre 6 cylinder BMW 335 saloon, a fine 90 mph car for the German autobahns. During the war he was occupied with military vehicle design and development and finished up at Munich, so that after the war he was in the American zone. During the war he was a Director of BMW, but left the board in 1945.

== In England ==
In 1947 Fiedler joined AFN Ltd at the persuasion of H.J. Aldington. Although he was lent to Bristol as a consultant on their Type 400 project, he did most of his work in England at Isleworth, where he was always known as Dr Fiedler, although he did not have that title in Germany. He was very popular with the workforce at AFN, most people describing him as a kindly and charming man, and everyone admired his engineering qualities. He took charge of the development of the post-war Frazer Nash, dealing with chassis, suspension, body design and construction and development of the FNS Bristol engine. On the Isleworth dynamometer he got over 100 bhp from the Bristol engine before the Bristol men did.

== Return to Germany and BMW ==
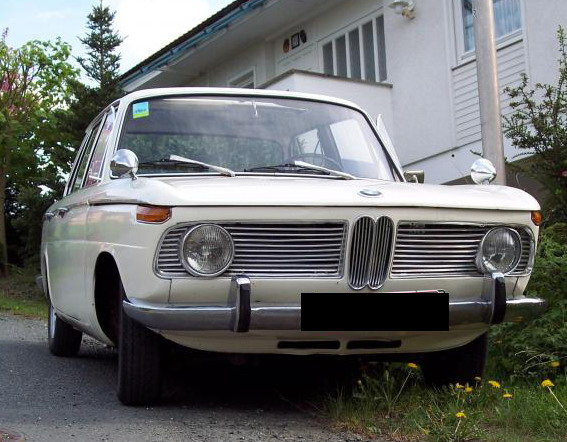
...and the one that designed the New Class sedan introduced in 1961, from which the modern BMW has evolved.

After three years with AFN Ltd, Fiedler returned to Germany. He returned to BMW as chief engineer in 1952 after working at Opel for a short time. He took over responsibility for the ongoing V8 engine project and was responsible for the BMW 503 and BMW 507. He was chairman of BMW AG from 1955 to 1956 and he finally retired in 1966, after a long and active life devoted to BMW, but he attended the firm each day as a consultant for a further two years and died in 1972.
