= M78 =

M78 or M-78 may refer to:

- BMW M78, a straight-six engine built by BMW
- M-78 (Michigan highway), a state highway in Michigan
- Messier 78, a reflection nebula in the constellation Orion
- E-M78 also known as E1b1b1a, a Y chromosome haplogroup
- Nebula M78, or the Land of Light, the homeland of Ultraman and other Ultras
