= BMW M328 =

BMW M328 engine
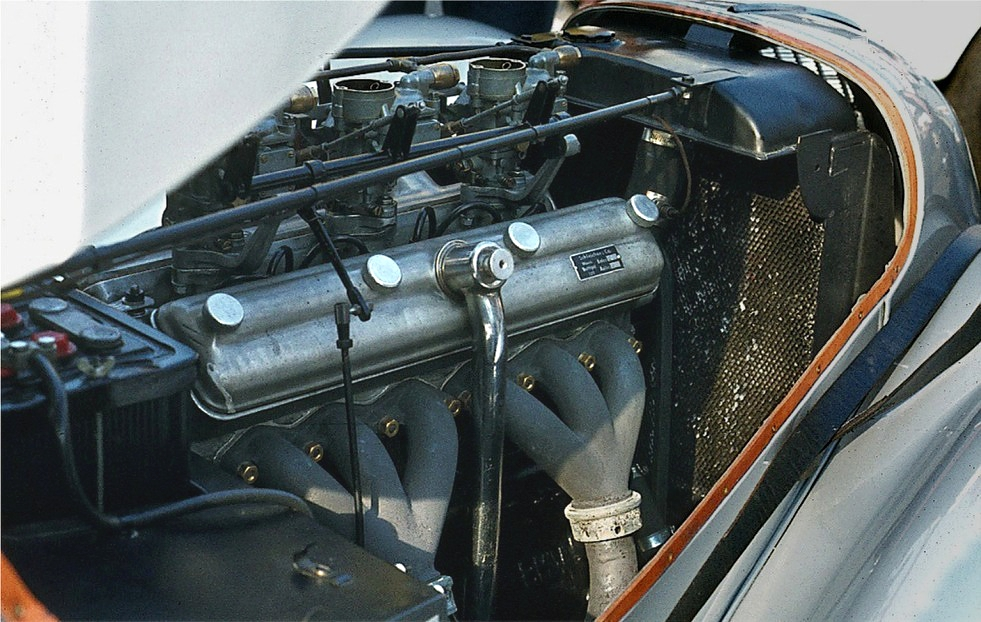

Overview
- Production: 1936–1940

Layout
- Configuration: Straight-6
- Displacement: 2.0 L (1,971 cc)
- Cylinder bore: 66 mm (2.60 in)
- Piston stroke: 96 mm (3.78 in)
- Cylinder block material: Aluminium
- Cylinder head material: Aluminium
- Valvetrain: OHV

Combustion
- Fuel type: Petrol

Chronology
- Predecessor: BMW M78
- Successor: BMW M335

The BMW M328 is an overhead valve straight-six petrol internal combustion engine which was produced from 1936 to 1940. It was a high-performance development of the BMW M78 engine, and was produced alongside the M78.

Unlike with the M78, the M328 has an aluminium cross-flow cylinder head with hemispherical combustion chambers.

The M328 was used in the BMW 328 and BMW 327/28 coupes.

After World War II the engine was also licensed to Bristol Cars in the United Kingdom.

== Design ==
The M328 has an unusual valvetrain design. The single camshaft is mounted low on the side of the engine block, and drives a rocker shaft on the intake side of the cylinder head through a set of vertical pushrods. A second set of horizontal pushrods run in tubes across the cylinder head to another rocker shaft on the exhaust side of the head. This results in a valve layout similar to a DOHC engine.

With a bore of 66 mm (2.60 in) and a stroke of 96 mm (3.78 in), displacement is 1,971 cc (120.3 cu in); the same as its M78 predecessor. Fuel is supplied via three Solex 30 JF downdraught carburettors.

The M328 engine has a compression ratio of 7.5:1 and produces 59 kW (79 bhp) at 5000 rpm.

== Versions ==
Version	Displacement	Power	Torque	Years
M328	1,971 cc (120.3 cu in)	59 kW (79 bhp) at 5000 rpm	126 N⋅m (93 lb⋅ft) at 4000 rpm	1936–1940

Applications:

- 1936–1940 328
- 1937–1940 327/28
- 1947–1950 HH

== See also ==
- BMW
- List of BMW engines
