= BMW 320 =

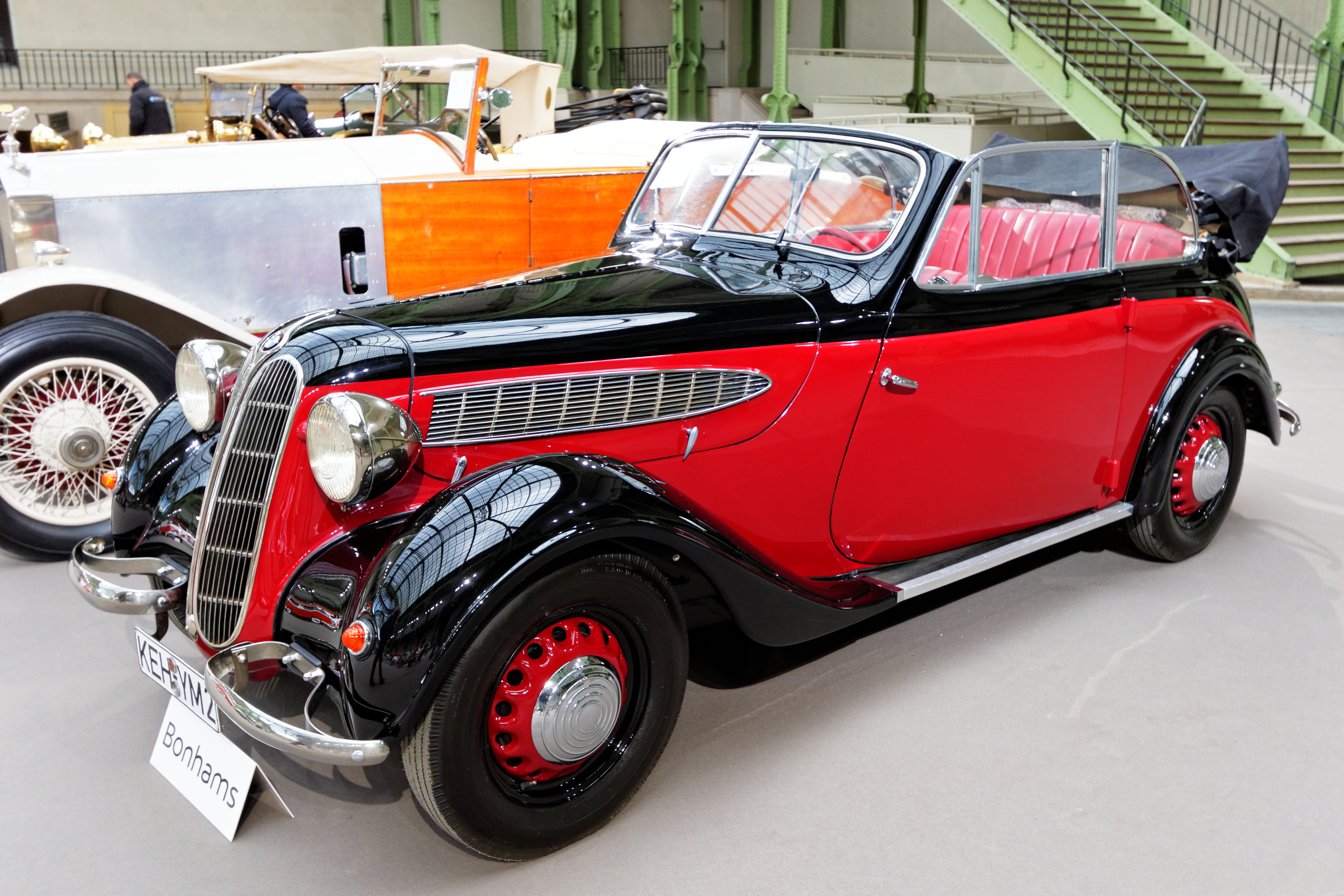
- 1938 BMW 320 cabriolet

Overview
- Manufacturer: BMW
- Production: 1937–1938
- Assembly: Germany: Eisenach

Body and chassis
- Class: Mid-size car
- Body style: 2-door saloon; 2-door cabriolet
- Layout: Front-engine, rear-wheel-drive
- Related: BMW 315, BMW 329 (suspension); BMW 326 (engine, chassis)

Powertrain
- Engine: 1971 cc OHV M78 straight-6
- Transmission: 4-speed manual

Dimensions
- Wheelbase: 2,750 mm (108.3 in)
- Length: 4,500 mm (177.2 in)
- Width: 1,540 mm (60.6 in)
- Height: 1,500 mm (59.1 in)
- Kerb weight: 1,000 kg (2,204.6 lb)

Chronology
- Predecessor: BMW 329
- Successor: BMW 321

The BMW 320 was a car manufactured by BMW in Germany from 1937 to 1938, as the successor to the 319-based BMW 329. It was offered in 2-door saloon and convertible versions. Approximately 4,200 cars were made, of which 1,835 were cabriolets.

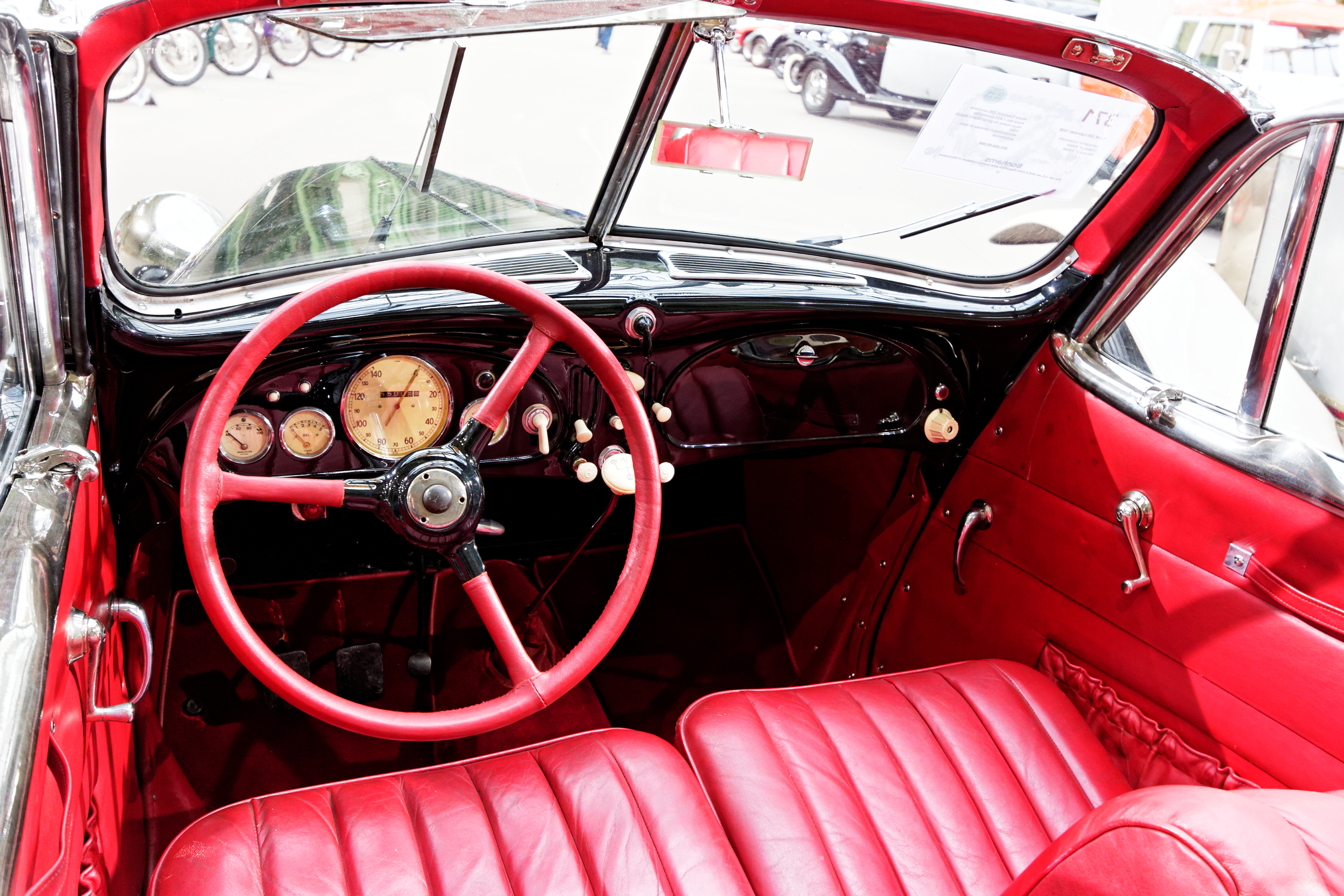
BMW 320 cabriolet interior

The car was first presented in July 1937. It showed a very similar resemblance to the 329. The 320 was built on a shortened BMW 326 frame and used a 326 engine with a single carburettor and an output of 45 hp (33 kW). The 320 had a top speed of 65 mph (105 km/h). The suspension, which was carried over from the 329, consisted of an independent front suspension with a high-mounted transverse leaf spring acting as upper control arms and a conventional live axle on semi-elliptic springs at the rear. It had a slightly greater displacement 6-cylinder engine. It was available as a two-door sedan or two-door convertible and stayed until 1938. The BMW 320 was smaller, less expensive, and lighter than its predecessor. It offered easy handling and a balanced power-to-weight ratio.

The 320 was replaced by the BMW 321 in 1938.
