= BMW M78 =

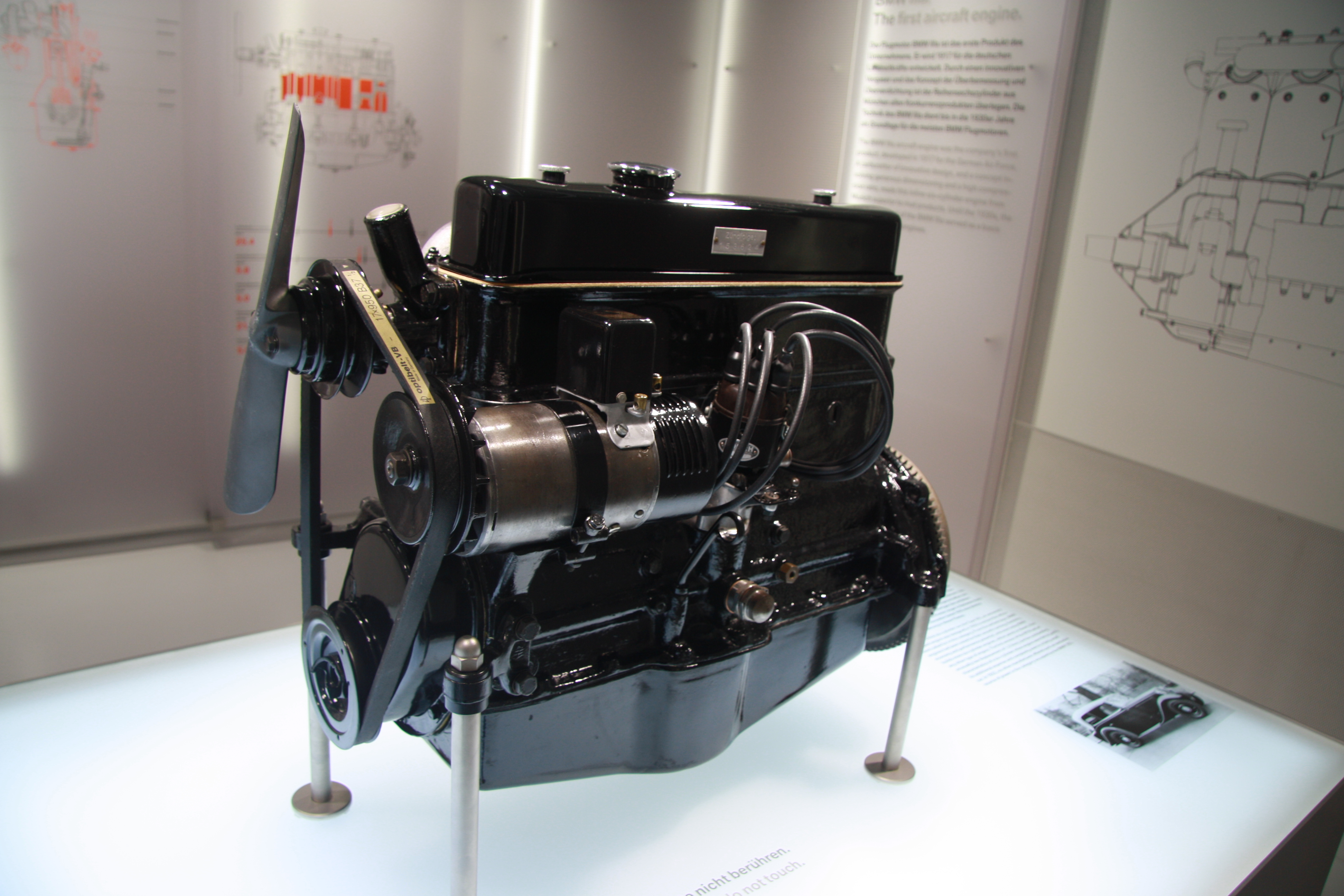

Overview
- Production: 1933–1950

Layout
- Configuration: Straight-six engine
- Displacement: 1.2 L (1,182 cc); 1.5 L (1,490 cc); 1.9 L (1,911 cc); 2.0 L (1,971 cc)
- Cylinder bore: 56 mm (2.20 in); 58 mm (2.28 in); 65 mm (2.56 in); 66 mm (2.60 in)
- Piston stroke: 80 mm (3.15 in); 94 mm (3.70 in); 96 mm (3.78 in)
- Cylinder block material: Iron
- Cylinder head material: reverse-flow, iron
- Valvetrain: OHV
- Valvetrain drive system: chain

Combustion
- Operating principle: spark ignition (Otto)
- Fuel system: 2 × horizontal draught carburettor
- Fuel type: Petrol

Chronology
- Predecessor: None
- Successor: BMW M337

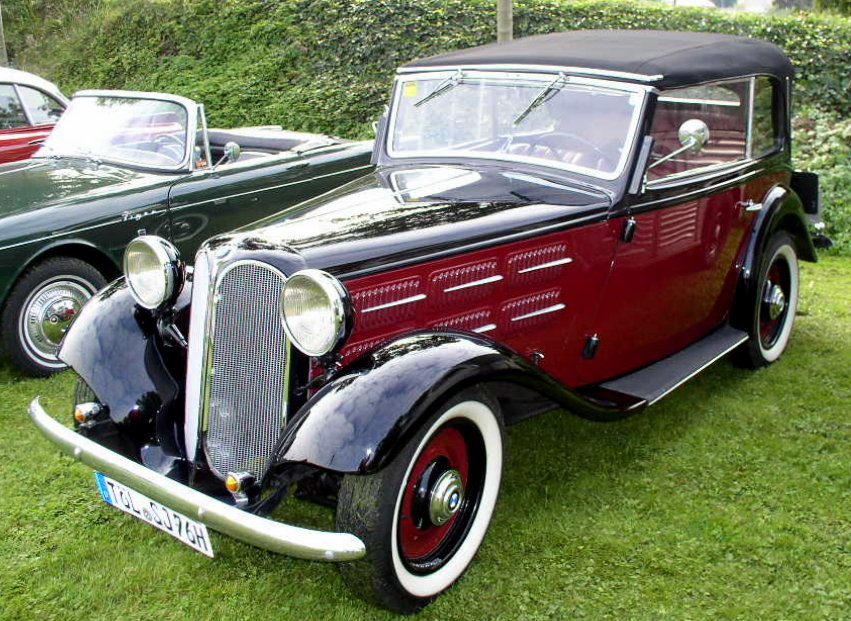
BMW 303 (1933-1934)

The BMW M78 is a petrol overhead valve straight-six engine which was produced from 1933 to 1950. It is the first straight-6 automobile engine produced by BMW, an engine layout which has been a key feature of the brand for many years since.

The M78 was launched in the 1933 BMW 303. In 1936, the higher performance BMW M328 straight-six engine began to be produced alongside the M78. In 1952, the BMW M337 engine was introduced as the replacement to the M78. Compared with the M78, the M337 has a revised cylinder head, a new inlet manifold and a reinforced crankshaft with bigger, more modern bearings.

== Design ==
The M78 was designed by Rudolf Schleicher as a medium power straight-6 engine. Initial versions of the M78 had the same bore and stroke as the BMW 3/20's four-cylinder engine. The M78 has two main cast pieces, the iron cylinder block, and the reverse-flow cylinder head, also made from iron. The oilpan, and the cylinder head cover are made from pressed steel. In addition to that, the M78 has a pressed-steel cover for the chain that drives the in-block camshaft. Both the crankshaft, and the camshaft have four bearings. The camshaft also drives the shaft for the oil pump and the ignition distributor. The engine has overhead valves that are actuated through pushrods and rocker arms. The water pump is flange-mounted to the cylinder head, and powered by a belt that is driven by a pulley that is flanged to the crankshaft. The belt also powers the alternator. The spark plugs are installed almost horizontally, below the intake manifold. BMW installed two horizontal draught Solex 26 mm carburettors next to the engine block and flange-mounted them to the intake manifold that sits atop them, i.e. the carburettors "hang down" from the intake manifold.

== Models ==
Model	Displacement	Power	Year
303 version	1,182 cc (72.1 cu in)	22 kW (30 PS)	1933-1934
315 version	1,490 cc (90.9 cu in)	25 kW (34 PS)	1934-1937
315/1 version	1,490 cc (90.9 cu in)	29 kW (40 PS)	1934-1937
319 version	1,911 cc (116.6 cu in)	33 kW (45 PS)	1935-1937
319/1 version	1,911 cc (116.6 cu in)	40 kW (55 PS)	1935-1937
326 version	1,971 cc (120.3 cu in)	37 kW (50 PS)	1936-1950
320 version	1,971 cc (120.3 cu in)	33 kW (45 PS)	1937-1938
327 version	1,971 cc (120.3 cu in)	40 kW (55 PS)	1937-1953

=== 303 version ===
This first version of the M78 had a bore of 56 mm (2.20 in), a stroke of 80 mm (3.15 in) and a compression ratio of 5.6:1. It produces 22 kW (30 PS) and 68 N⋅m (50 lb⋅ft).

Applications:

- 1933-1934 303

=== 315 version ===
A development of the 303 version, where the bore was increased from 56 to 58 mm (2.20 to 2.28 in) and the stroke was increased from 80 to 94 mm (3.15 to 3.70 in). The compression ratio remained at 5.6:1. This engine produces 25 kW (34 PS) at 4000 rpm.

Applications:

- 1934-1937 315

=== 315/1 version ===
An upgraded version of the 315 engine with the compression ratio increased to 6.8:1 and using three Solex carburetors. This version produces 29 kW (40 PS) at 4000 rpm.

Applications

- 1934-1937 315/1

=== 319 version ===
The 315 engine was enlarged to 1,911 cc (116.6 cu in) for the 319. This was a result of increasing the bore to 65 mm (2.56 in) and the stroke to 96 mm (3.78 in). This engine produces 33 kW (45 PS) at 3750 rpm.

Applications:

- 1935-1937 319
- 1937 329

=== 319/1 version ===
The triple-carburetted 319/3 engine

The 315/1 engine was enlarged to 1.9 L (1,911 cc) for the 319/1. This was a result of increasing the bore to 65 mm (2.56 in) and the stroke to 96 mm (3.78 in). This engine produces 55 PS (40 kW) at 4000 rpm. The version sold by Frazer Nash in the UK used SU carburettors and received the 319/3 code.

Applications:

- 1935-1937 319/1

=== 326 version ===
The 319 engine was enlarged to 2.0 L (1,971 cc) for the 326 by increasing the bore by one millimetre to 66 mm (2.6 in). Twin 26 mm (1.0 in) Solex carburetors were used. The compression ratio was raised to 6.0:1. This engine produces 37 kW (50 PS) at 3750 rpm.

Applications:

- 1936-1946 326
- 1938-1950 321

=== 320 version ===
The 326 engine was detuned (by using a single carburetor) for the 320 and 321. This engine produces 33 kW (45 PS) at 3750 rpm.

Applications:

- 1937-1938 320
- 1938-1941 321

=== 327 version ===
The 327 used a version of the 326 engine with a new cylinder head, yielding a 6.3:1 compression ratio and a slight power increase to 40 kW (55 PS) at 4500 rpm. The engine retains its 66 by 96 mm bore and stroke, resulting in a displacement of 1,971 cm^{3} (120.3 in^{3}). The engine has a BMEP of 6.7 kp/cm^{2} (0.66 MPa; 95.30 lbf/in^{2}) at 3750/min, equivalent to a max torque of 104 N⋅m (10.6 kp⋅m; 76.7 lb⋅ft) at 3750/min.

Applications:

- 1937-1955 327
- 1949-1953 340

== See also ==
- BMW
- List of BMW engines
