= BMW 328 =

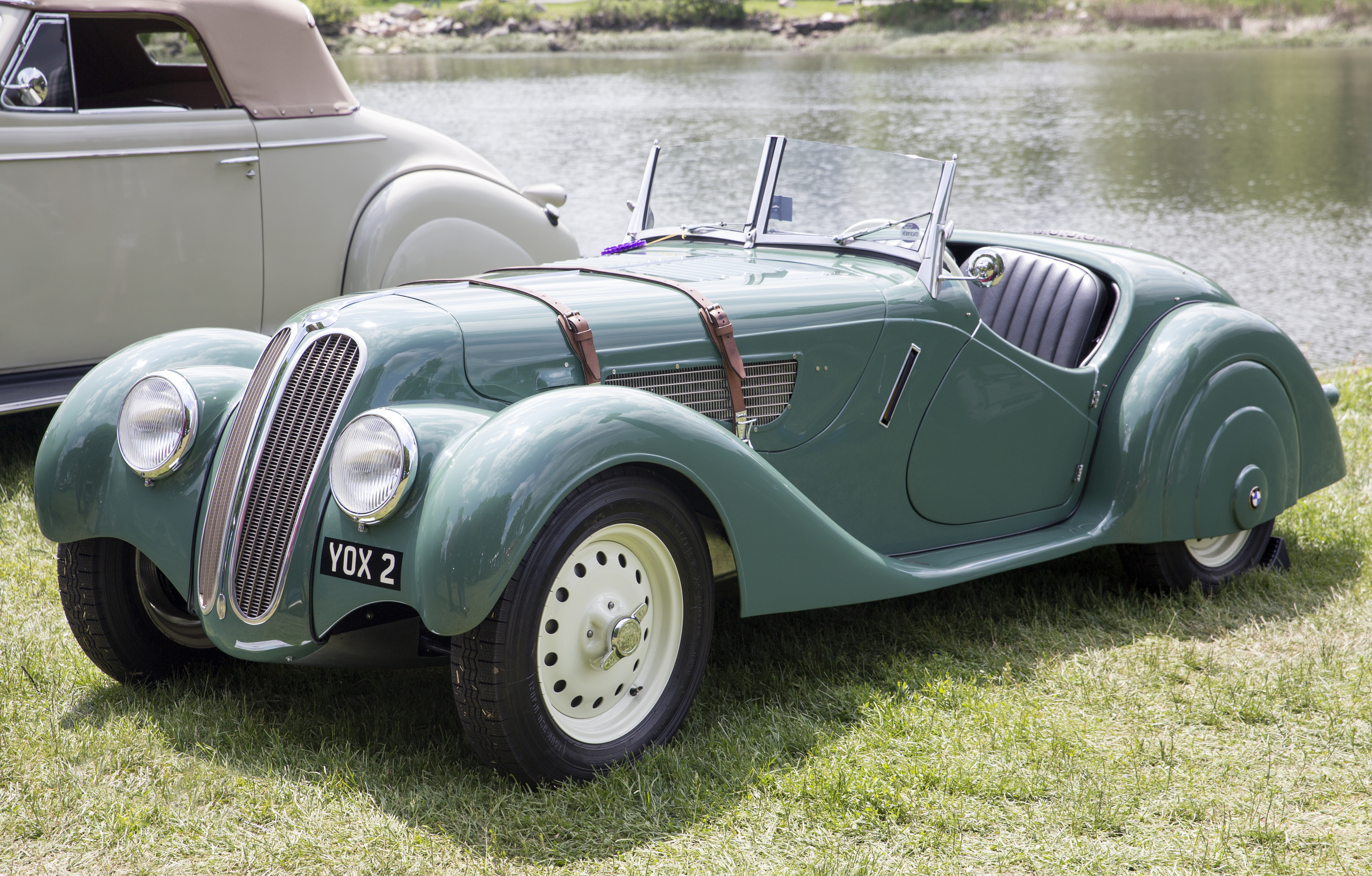

Overview
- Manufacturer: BMW
- Production: 1936–1940; 464 produced
- Assembly: Germany: Eisenach
- Designer: Peter Szymanowski; Fritz Fiedler; Alfred Böning; Alex von Falkenhausen; Ernst Loof

Body and chassis
- Class: Sports car
- Body style: roadster
- Layout: FR layout
- Related: BMW 319/1 (steering and suspension); BMW 326 (brakes, engine block)

Powertrain
- Engine: 1,971 cc M328 I6
- Transmission: 4-speed manual

Dimensions
- Wheelbase: 2,400 mm (94.5 in)
- Length: 3,900 mm (153.5 in)
- Width: 1,550 mm (61.0 in)
- Height: 1,400 mm (55.1 in)
- Curb weight: 830 kg (1,830 lb)

Chronology
- Predecessor: BMW 319/1
- Successor: BMW 507

The BMW 328 is a sports car produced by BMW from 1936 to 1940. Its body design is credited to Peter Szymanowski, who became BMW chief of design after World War II (although technically the car was designed by Fritz Fiedler).

== Specifications ==
Specifications
Engine	Straight-6 OHV (light alloy cylinder head)
Displacement	2.0 L (1,971 cc; 120.3 cu in)
Bore × Stroke	66 mm × 96 mm (2.6 in × 3.8 in)
Compression ratio	7.5:1
Fuel feed	3× Solex 30 JF downdraft carburetors
Power	80 PS (59 kW; 79 hp) at 5000 rpm
Valve train	Pushrod OHV, side cam shaft driven by duplex chain
Fuel capacity	50 L (13 US gal; 11 imp gal) (if needed 100 L (26 US gal; 22 imp gal) possible)
Cooling	Pump (7.5 L water)
Transmission	4-speed manual
Chassis	Aluminium body and steel ladder frame
Suspension front	Independent with transverse leaf spring
Suspension rear	Live axle with leaf springs
Shock absorbers	Hydraulic shock absorbers
Brakes	280 mm (11 in)-diameter hydraulic drum brakes
Wheelbase	2,400 mm (94 in)
Track f/r	1,153 / 1,220 mm (45.4 / 48.0 in)
External dimensions l×w×h	3,900 mm × 1,550 mm × 1,400 mm (154 in × 61 in × 55 in)
Tyres	5.25 or 5.50–16
Unloaded weight	830 kg (1,830 lb)
Top speed:	150 km/h (93 mph)

== Awards ==
In 1999, the BMW 328 was named one of 25 finalists for Car of the Century by a worldwide panel of automotive journalists.

== Motorsports ==
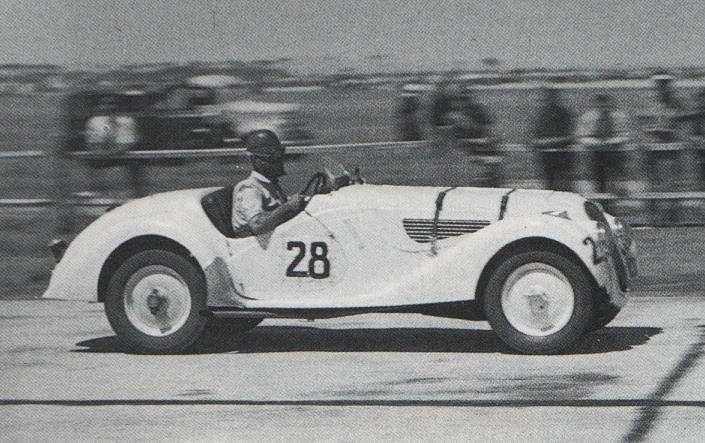
Frank Pratt won the 1948 Australian Grand Prix driving a 328.

The 328 was introduced at the Eifelrennen race at the Nürburgring in 1936, where Ernst Henne drove it to victory in the 2.0-litre class. The 328 had more than 100 class wins in 1937, including the RAC Tourist Trophy, the Österreichische Alpenfahrt, and the La Turbie hillclimb. In 1938, the 328 won its class at the RAC Tourist Trophy, the Alpine Rally, and the Mille Miglia.

The 328 won the RAC Rally in 1939 and came in fifth overall and first in class in the 1939 24 Hours of Le Mans.

Frank Pratt won the 1948 Australian Grand Prix driving a 328.

=== Mille Miglia ===
In 1938, the BMW 328 became a class winner in Mille Miglia.

In 1940, the Mille Miglia Touring Coupé won the Mille Miglia with an average speed of 166.7 km/h (103.6 mph).

In 2004, the BMW 328 Mille Miglia Touring Coupé became the first car to win both the Mille Miglia (1940) and the modern-day classical version of the race.

== Production ==
After the Second World War, the manufacturing plant in Eisenach where the 328 had been built found itself in the Soviet occupation zone, and automobile manufacturing in Eisenach would follow a state-directed path until German Reunification in 1989.

== Influence on Bristol ==
One of the Mille Miglia 328s (disguised as a Frazer Nash) and BMW's technical plans for the car were taken from the bombed BMW factory by English representatives from the Bristol Aeroplane Company and Frazer Nash companies. Fiedler, the BMW engineer, was persuaded to come, too. Bristol Cars was set up to build complete cars, called Bristols, and would also supply engines to Frazer Nash for all their post-war cars. The first Bristol car, the 400, was heavily based on the BMW plans. This Bristol engine was also an option in AC cars, before the V8-engined Cobra.

== Gallery ==
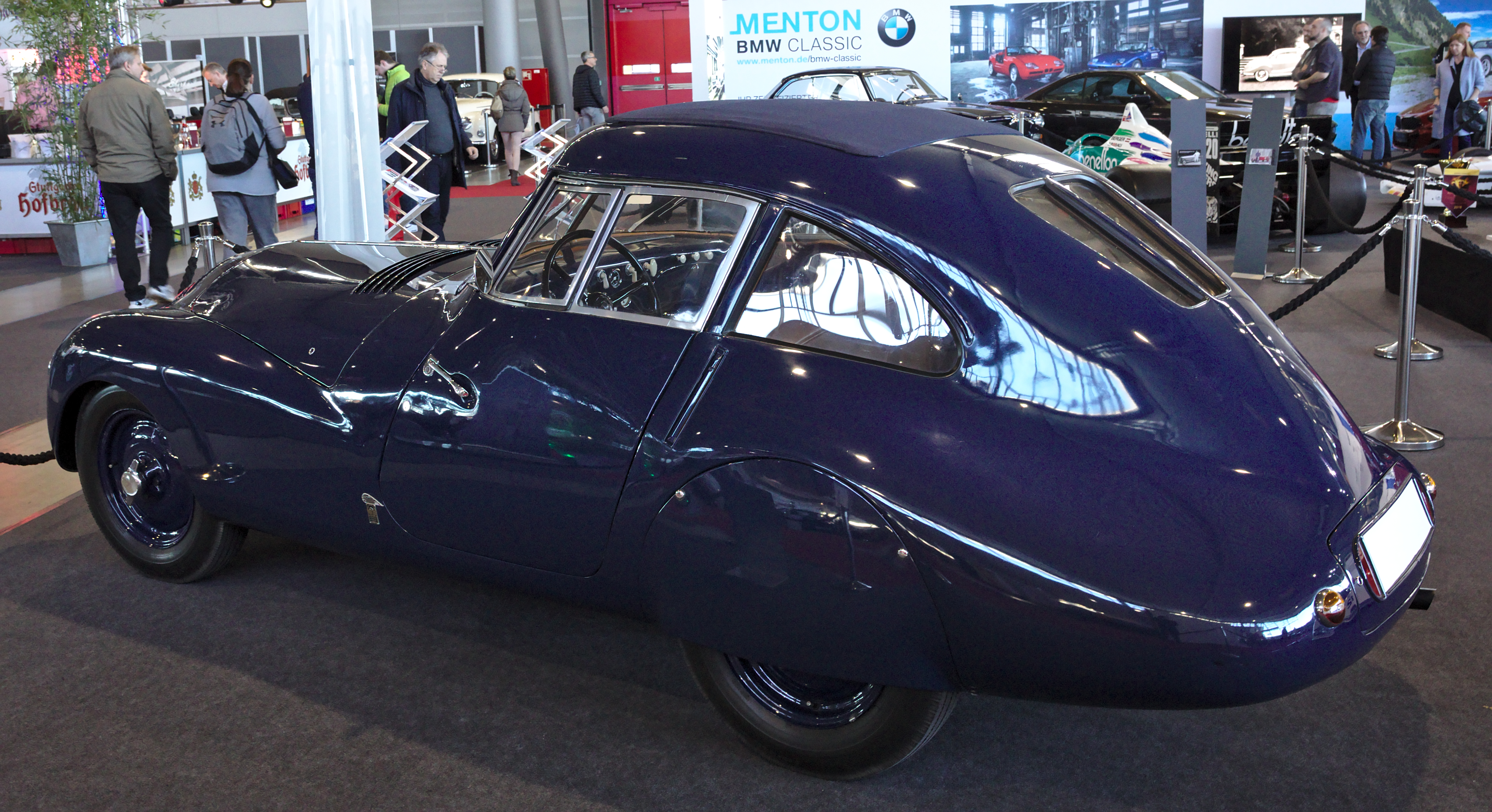
1937 BMW 328 "Fachsenfeld" Coupé

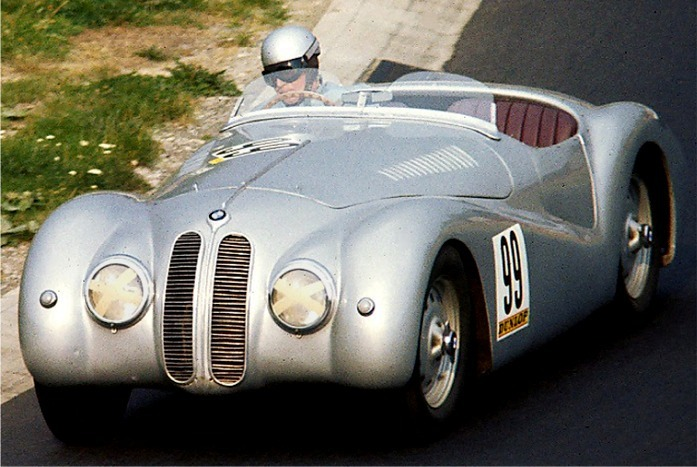
1940 BMW 328 "Mille Miglia", with Adolf Brudes as the driver

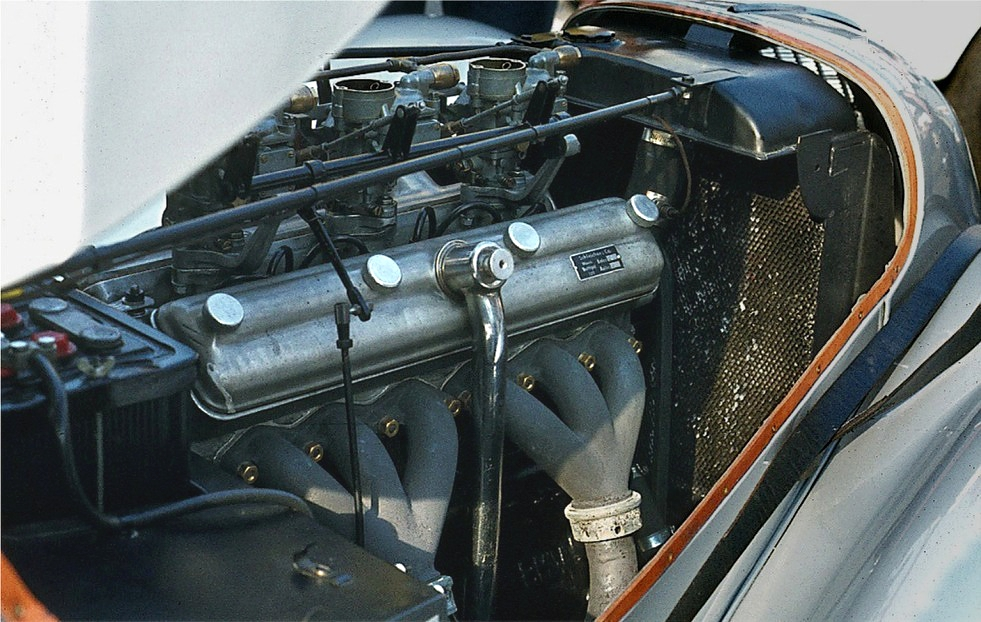
Picture of BMW 328 engine

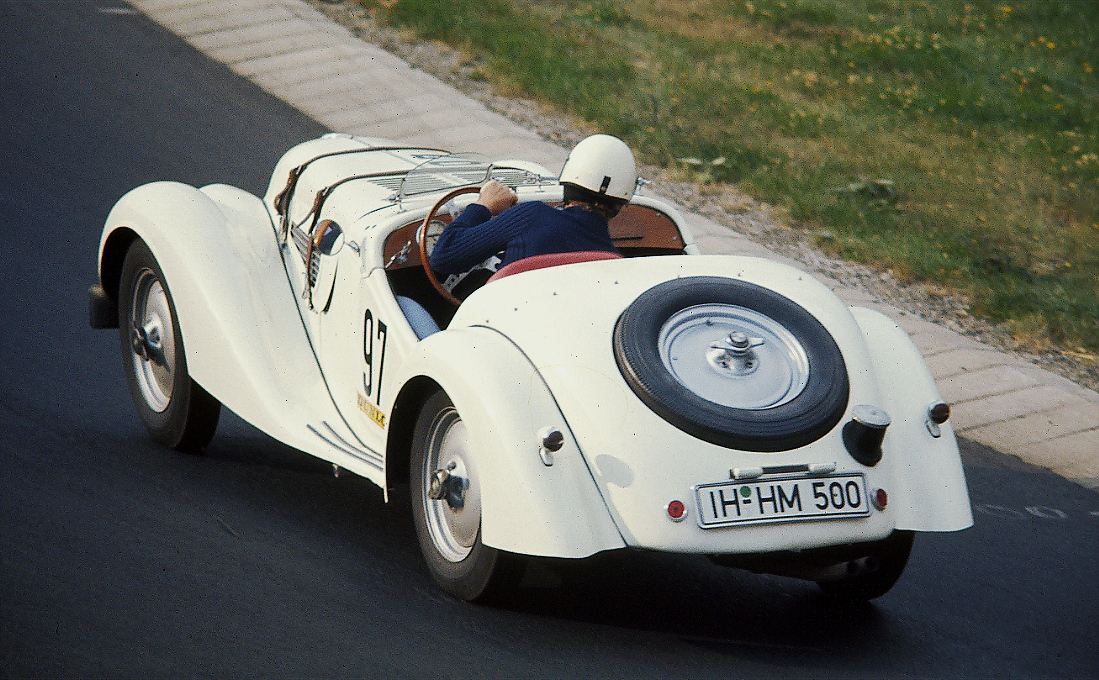
BMW 328, production year 1938

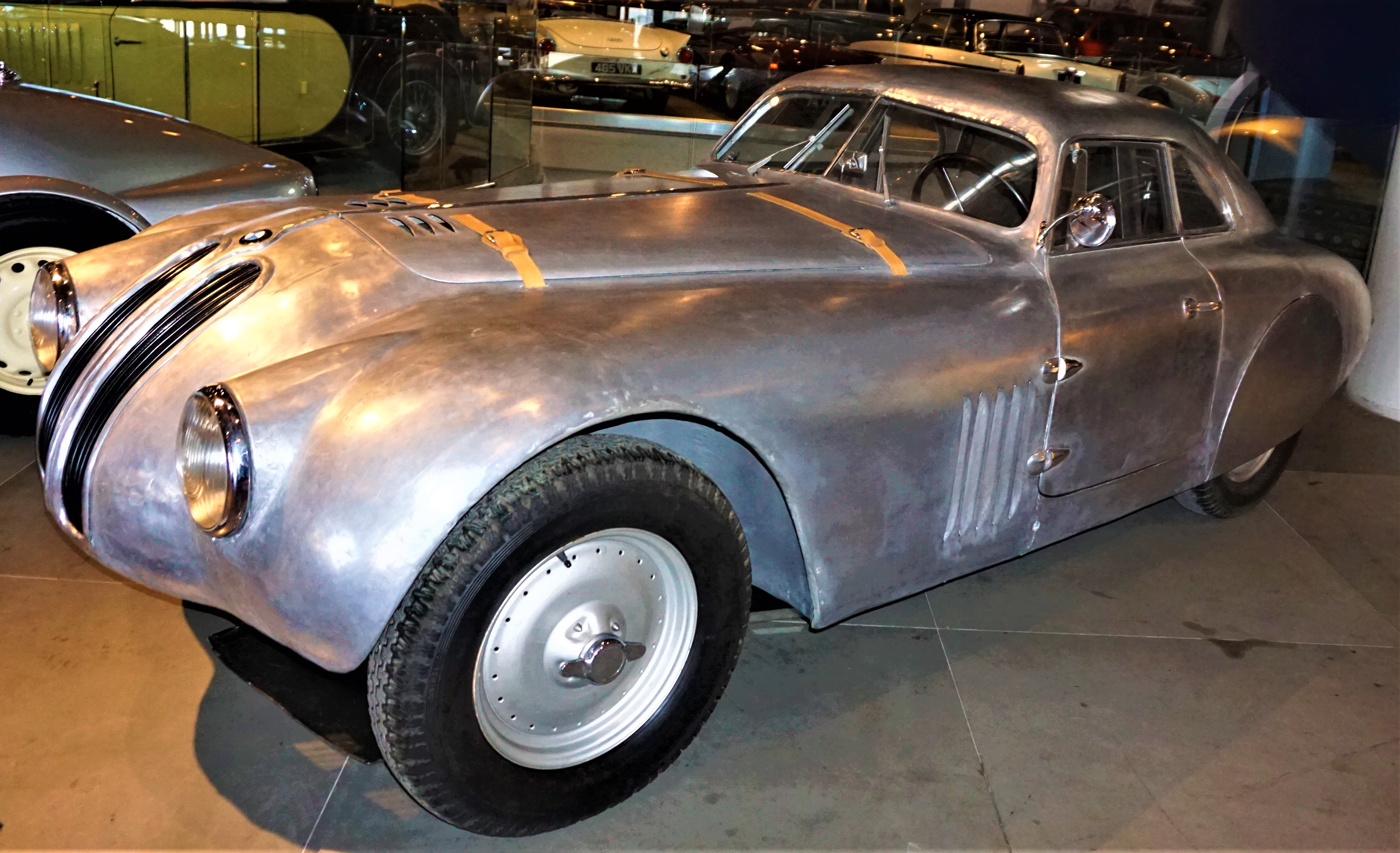
BMW 328 "Camo coupe" by Carrozzeria Motto
