= BMW 326 =

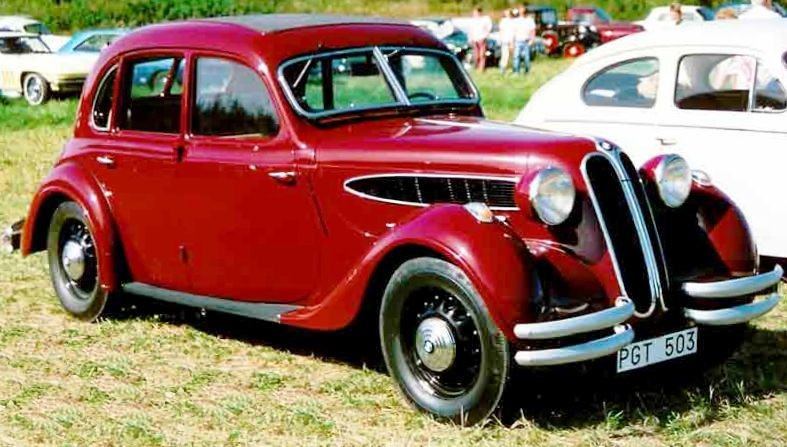

Overview
- Manufacturer: BMW
- Production: 1936–1941 (15,936 built); 1945–1946 (16 built)
- Assembly: Germany: Eisenach (1936–1941); East Germany: Eisenach (1945–1946)
- Designer: Engineers: Fritz Fiedler, Alfred Böning; Stylist: Peter Szymanowski

Body and chassis
- Class: Mid-size
- Body style: 4-door saloon 2 & 4-door cabriolets
- Layout: FR layout
- Related: BMW 327; BMW 328

Powertrain
- Engine: 1971 cc OHV BMW M78 Straight 6
- Transmission: 4-speed manual

Dimensions
- Wheelbase: 2,870 mm (113 in)
- Length: 4,600 mm (180 in)
- Width: 1,600 mm (63 in)
- Height: 1,540 mm (61 in)
- Curb weight: 1,100 kg (2,400 lb) (measurements approximate)

Chronology
- Predecessor: BMW 319
- Successor: BMW/EMW 340

The BMW 326 is a medium-sized sedan produced by BMW between 1936 and 1941, and again briefly, under Soviet control, after 1945. The 326 was BMW's first four-door sedan. It had an innovative design and sold well despite its relatively high price. It also had an unusually involved afterlife.

== Design and engineering ==
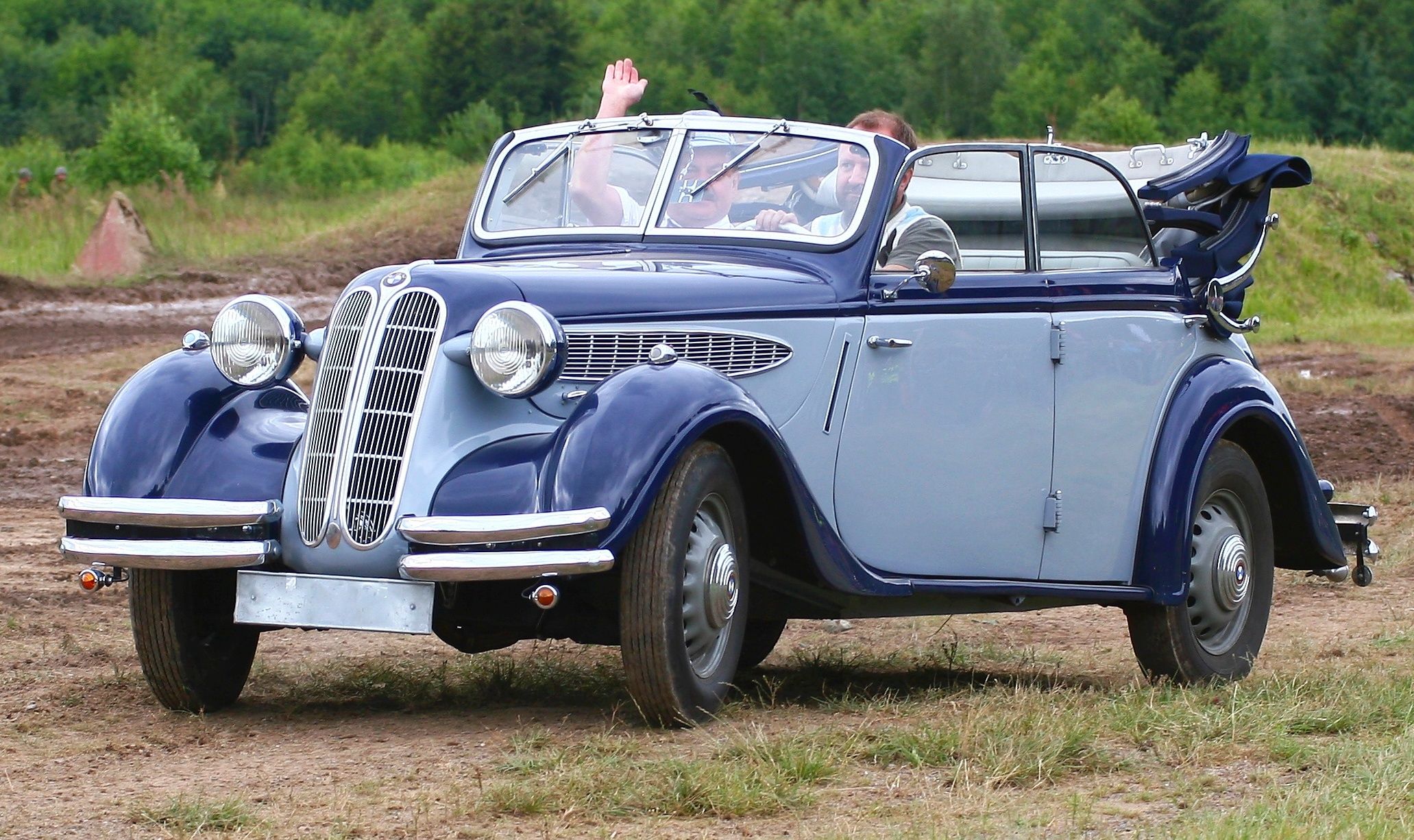
BMW 326 4-door cabriolet

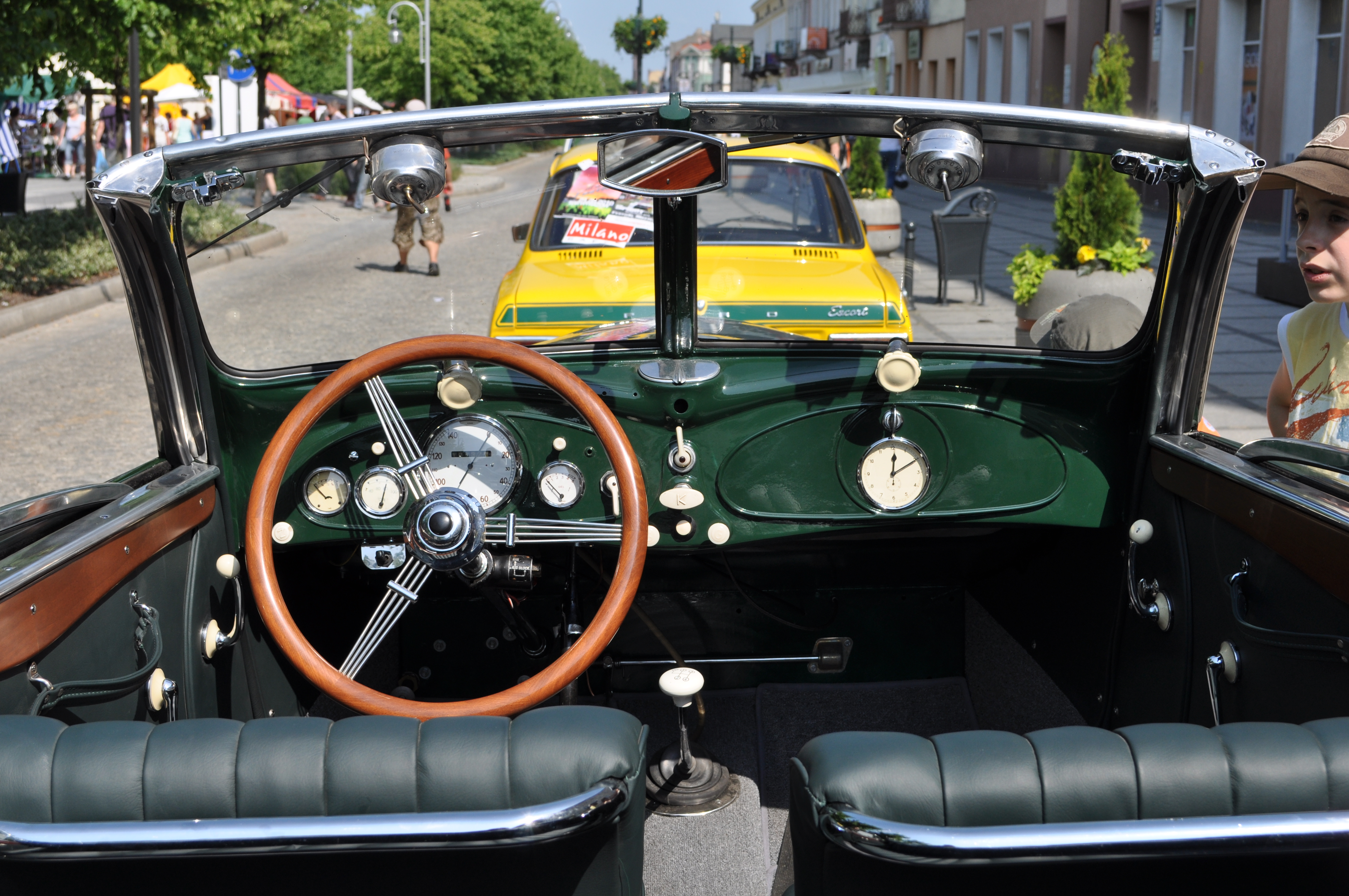
BMW 326 cabriolet interior

Designed by Fritz Fiedler, the 326 featured a box-section frame that could readily be adapted for derivative models. Also innovative were the torsion bar rear suspension, inspired by the dead axle suspension of the Citroën Traction Avant, and the hydraulic braking system, the first to be used on a BMW car. Styled by Peter Szymanowski, the 326 was offered as a four-door sedan and as a two- or four-door cabriolet. The 326 sedan was the first BMW available with four doors. The BMW 320, BMW 321, BMW 327, and BMW 335 were based on the 326. The streamlined form of the body contrasted with previous relatively upright BMWs: drag was presumably reduced further by including a fixed cover over the spare wheel at the back.

== Drivetrain ==
The 1971 cc straight 6 engine was a version of the 319's power plant, with the bore increased from 65 mm (2.6 in) to 66 mm (2.6 in), and an unchanged stroke of 96 mm (3.8 in) giving a displacement of 1,971 cc (120.3 cu in). In the 326 application, it was fed by twin 26 mm Solex carburetors to produce a claimed maximum output of 50 PS (37 kW) at 3750 rpm. The top speed is 115 km/h (71 mph).

The four-speed gear box was supported by freewheeling on the bottom ratios and synchromesh on the top two.

== Reception ==
The 326 was introduced at the Berlin Motor Show in February 1936, the 326 was offered for sale from May of that year. The 326 was a success. By the time production was suspended in 1941, the Eisenach plant had produced 15,949 of them.

== Afterlives ==
East Germany

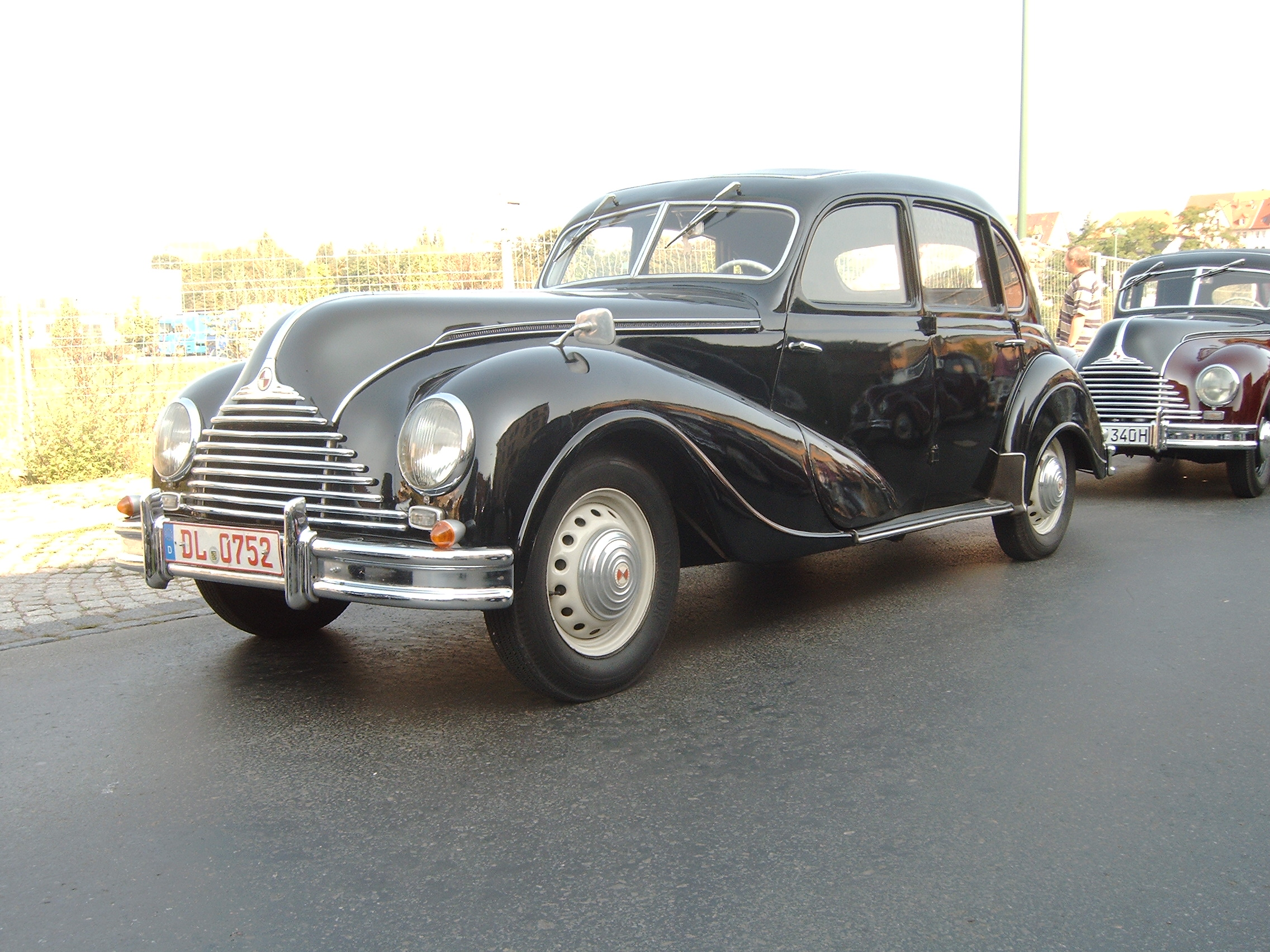
The Eisenach derivative

In 1945, Eisenach was occupied by US forces. However, the wartime allies had already agreed that Thuringia would fall within the Soviet occupation zone. The plant that BMW had originally acquired in 1929 was not fully destroyed, and it was possible for returning survivors to assemble sixteen postwar 326s. A modernised version, badged initially as the BMW 340, emerged around 1948. Despite the nomenclature, it was clear that BMW's Eisenach plant was no longer under the control of BMW: later BMW 340s, still based on the prewar 326, were badged as EMW 340s following a protracted dispute concerning title to the BMW name. It was, perhaps, a tribute to the 326's perceived excellence, together with the skills of the workers who had struggled to revive it, that the Eisenach plant was permitted to produce the BMW design until approximately 1955, long after the Auto Union assembly facilities at nearby Zwickau had been dismantled and removed to Russia as part of the war reparations package.

United Kingdom

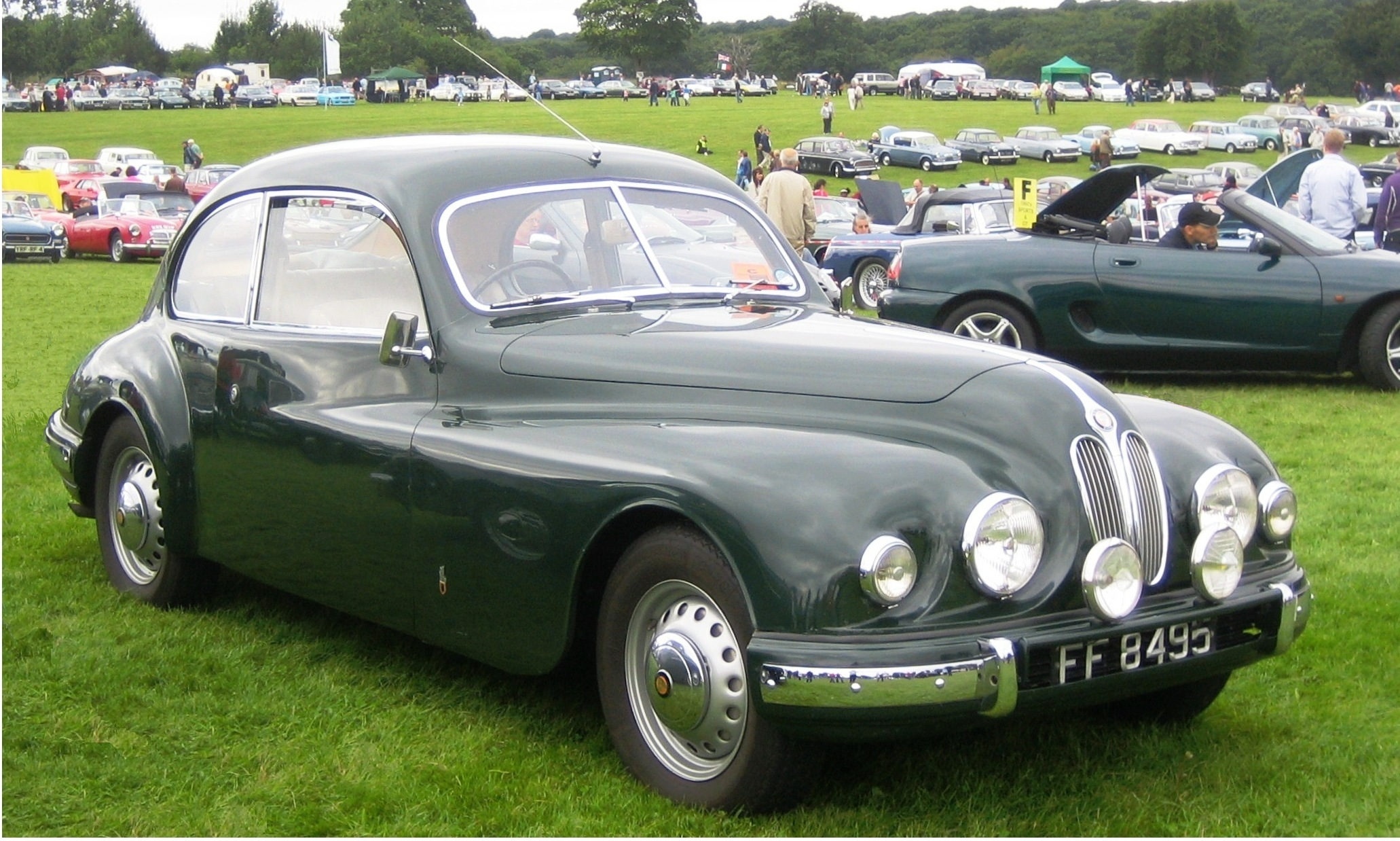
The Bristol derivative

The Russians were not alone in being impressed by the 326. Detailed plans of the sedan and coupé derivative models were also rescued by the British. In the 1930s Frazer-Nash had imported and adapted BMW designs. In 1945 just after World War II ended, Frazer-Nash were taken over by the Bristol Aeroplane Company, who negotiated rights to several BMW designs including the 326 and the six-cylinder engine. This led to a succession of Bristol Cars introduced between 1947 and 1953 that were unapologetic developments of the respected BMW design. Almost ten years after the war's end, the Bristol 403 produced between 1953 and 1955 still retained a BMW style front grille: under the skin the engine had been extensively upgraded, and the Bristol 403 now offered a claimed output of 100 bhp (75 kW). The engine size, at 1971 cc, was unchanged.
