= BMW 303 =

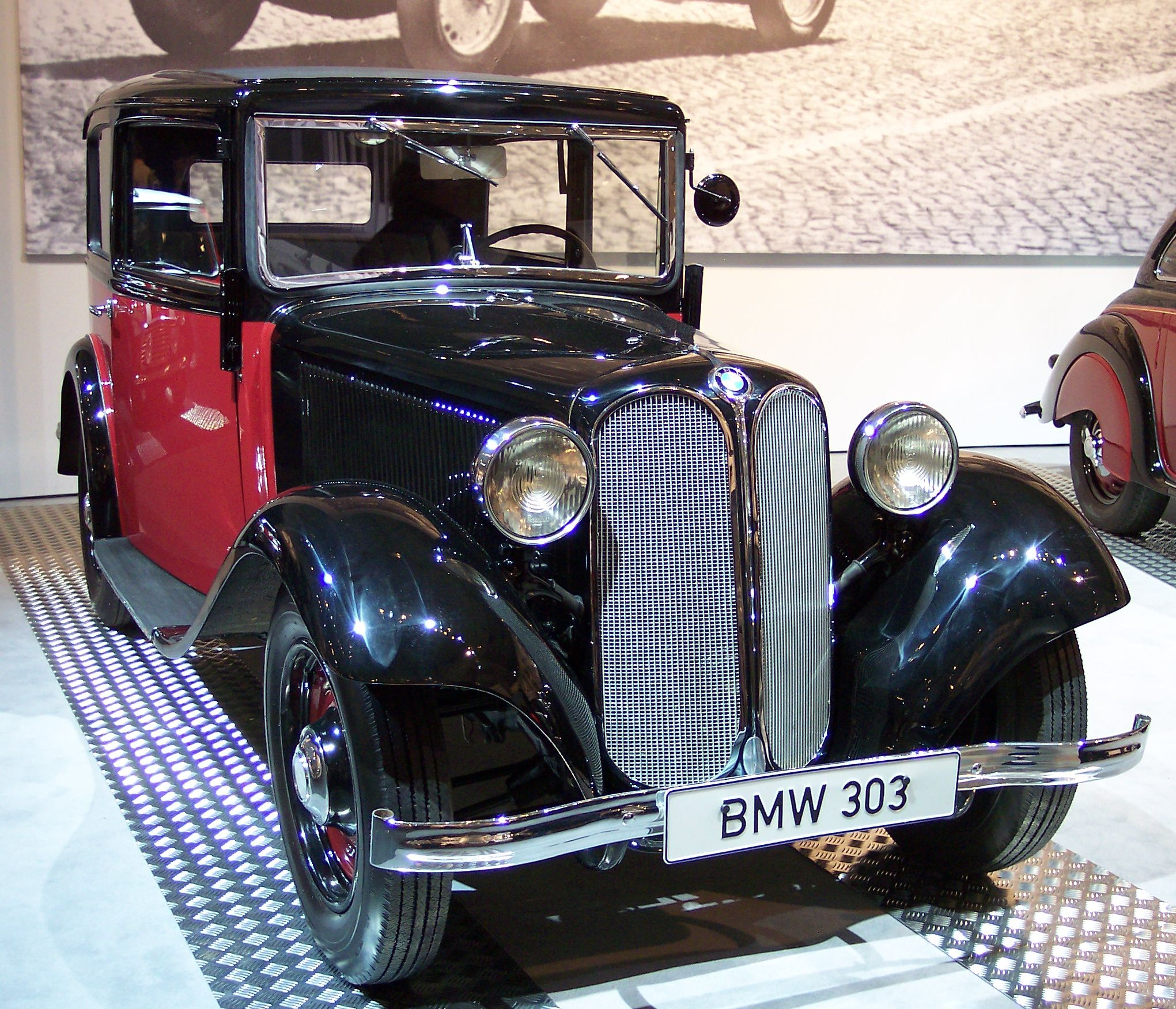
- 1933 BMW 303

Overview
- Manufacturer: BMW
- Production: 303: 1933–1934; 315: 1934–1937; 319: 1935–1936; 329: 1937
- Assembly: Germany: Thuringia, Eisenach

Body and chassis
- Class: Small family car
- Body style: 303, 315, 319: 2-door saloon, 2-door cabriolet 329: 2-door or 4-door cabriolet
- Layout: FMR layout
- Platform: BMW 303
- Related: BMW 309, BMW 315/1, BMW 319/1, BMW 328

Powertrain
- Engine: BMW M78 OHV I6; 303: 1,173 cc (71.6 cu in), 22.5 kW (31 PS; 30 hp) at 4000 rpm 315: 1,490 cc (90.9 cu in), 25 kW (34 PS; 34 hp) at 4000 rpm 319, 329: 1,911 cc (116.6 cu in), 34 kW (45.6 hp) at 3750 rpm
- Transmission: 4-speed manual, synchromesh on 3rd and 4th

Dimensions
- Wheelbase: 2,400 mm (94.5 in)
- Length: 3,900 mm (153.5 in)
- Width: 1,440 mm (56.7 in)
- Height: 1,550 mm (61.0 in)
- Kerb weight: 1,808 lb (820 kg)

Chronology
- Successor: BMW 315 (model); BMW 320 (series)

The BMW 303 was a small family saloon produced by BMW in 1933 and 1934. It was the first BMW motor car with a six-cylinder engine and the first BMW motor car with the "kidney grille" associated with the brand. The platform developed for the 303 was used for several other BMW cars, including the BMW 309, a four-cylinder version of the 303, the BMW 315, a 1.5-litre version of the 303 which replaced it in 1934 and was built until 1937, the BMW 319, a 1.9-litre version of the 303 produced alongside the 315 from 1935 to 1937, and the BMW 329, a development of the 319 with styling based on the newer, larger BMW 326, that briefly replaced the 319 in 1937.

The 303 platform was also used for the BMW 315/1 and BMW 319/1. These were high-performance versions of the 315 and 319 respectively, with tuned engines and lightweight roadster bodywork. The 315/1 and 319/1 were replaced by the BMW 328 in 1936.

== Design, engineering, and styling ==
=== Chassis and suspension ===
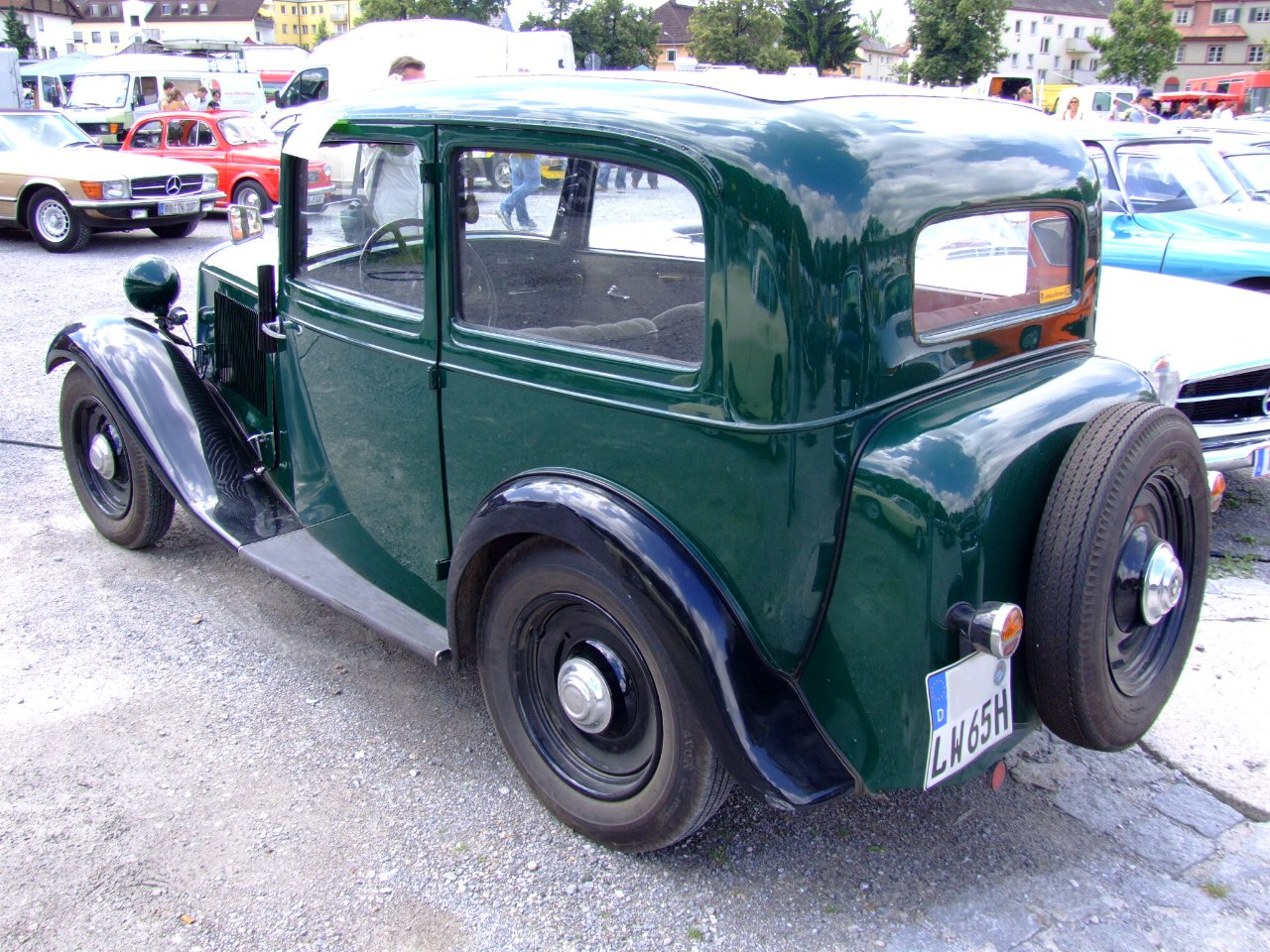
BMW 303 2-door saloon rear

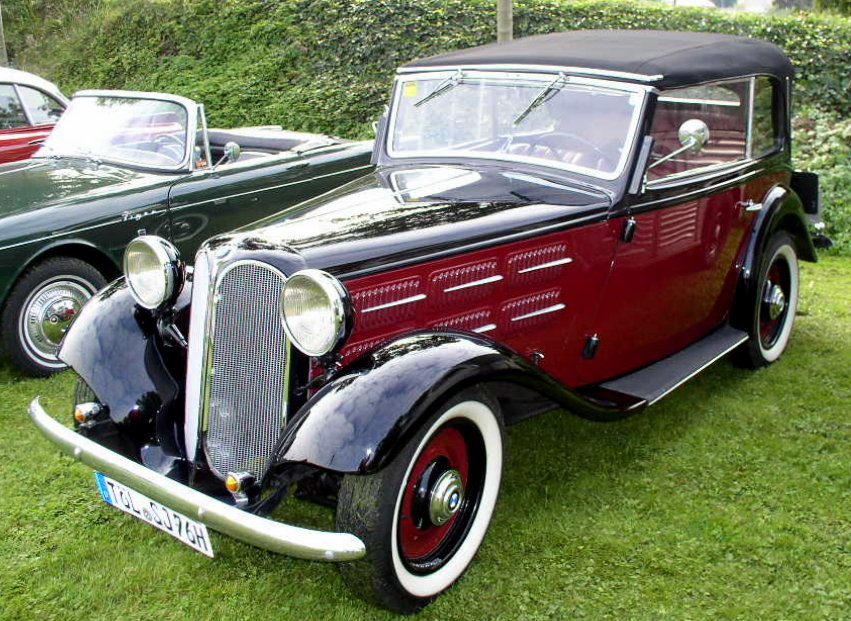
BMW 303 2-door cabriolet

Upon its introduction in 1933, the 303 was the largest car BMW had made. The wheelbase of the 303 was 2,400 mm (94.5 in), an increase of 300 mm (11.8 in) over the 3/20. The track, 1,150 mm (45.3 in) at the front and 1,220 mm (48.0 in) at the rear, was also wider than the 3/20's 1,100 mm (43.3 in) front and rear. Unlike the 3/20's backbone chassis, the 303 had a ladder frame made from tubular side members and box-section cross members.

The independent front suspension used a transverse mounted leaf spring mounted above the wheel centre line. The hubs were located with the spring mounts at the top and control arms at the bottom. The rear suspension used a live axle on semi-elliptic leaf springs, a conventional system neither as advanced nor as troublesome as the 3/20's swing axles.

The 303 was the first German car in its size and price class to have automatic "one-shot" chassis lubrication. Each wheel had a drum brake; all four were operated through the pedal using rods and levers, while the rear brakes were also operated by cables from the handbrake lever.

=== Engine ===
The 303 was the first BMW car to use a straight-6 engine. The M78 1182 cc six-cylinder engine was developed from the four-cylinder engine used in the 3/20. The engine had the same bore and stroke as the four, but the bore spacing was increased to allow for further increases in bore and to provide for crankshaft bearings between the ends of the crankshaft. The crankshaft ran in four plain bearings.

=== Styling ===
The 303 was the first BMW to use the 'kidney grille', which has since become a defining feature of the company's models.

Two-door saloon and cabriolet bodies were manufactured, at first by Daimler-Benz's coachworks in Sindelfingen, and later by Ambi-Budd in Berlin. Ambi-Budd would also offer a two-seat sports cabriolet for the 303.

== Reception ==
At the time it was being made, the 303 was the least expensive six-cylinder car in Germany. However, it was considered underpowered, with a top speed of 90 km/h (56 mph). The combination of soft spring rates at the front and hard spring rates at the rear caused understeer, body roll, and a generally unsettling pitching movement. 2300 BMW 303s were produced up to 1934, when the 303 was replaced by the 315.

== Models developed from the 303 ==
=== 309 ===
BMW 309
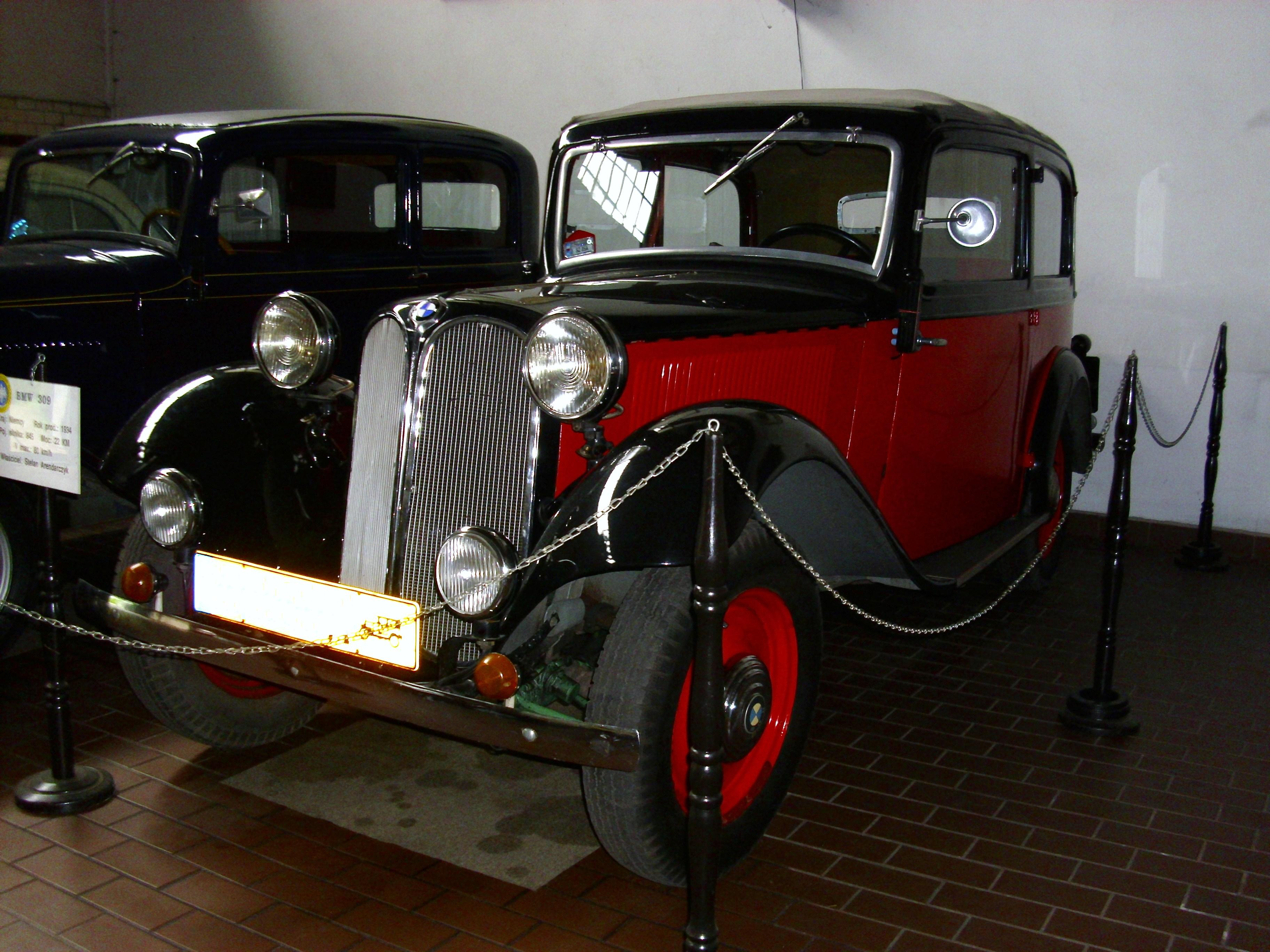
- 1934 BMW 309

Overview
- Manufacturer: BMW
- Production: 1934–1936
- Assembly: Germany: Thuringia, Eisenach

Body and chassis
- Class: Small family car
- Body style: 2-door saloon, 2-door cabriolet, 2-door tourer
- Layout: FMR layout
- Platform: BMW 303
- Related: BMW 303, BMW 315, BMW 319

Powertrain
- Engine: OHV I4

Dimensions
- Wheelbase: 2,400 mm (94.5 in)
- Length: 153.5 in (3,899 mm)
- Kerb weight: 1,654 lb (750 kg)

Chronology
- Predecessor: BMW 3/20
- Successor: BMW 600

The BMW 309 was a development of the 303. A replacement for the 3/20, the 309 was a 303 with a four-cylinder engine developed from the M78 six-cylinder engine used in the 303. The 309's engine had the bore increased from 56 mm (2.2 in) to 58 mm (2.3 in) which, with a stroke of 80 mm (3.1 in), gave a capacity of 845 cc (51.6 cu in) and maximum power of 16.5 kW (22 PS; 22 hp) at 4000 rpm.

In addition to the body styles offered with the 303, the 309 was also available as a tourer.

With the same body as the 303, the 309 offered the same amount of room at a lower cost and a lower tax rating based on its smaller engine. The 309 was manufactured from 1934 to 1936, with a total of 6,000 made.

=== Six-cylinder successors: 315, 319, and 329 ===
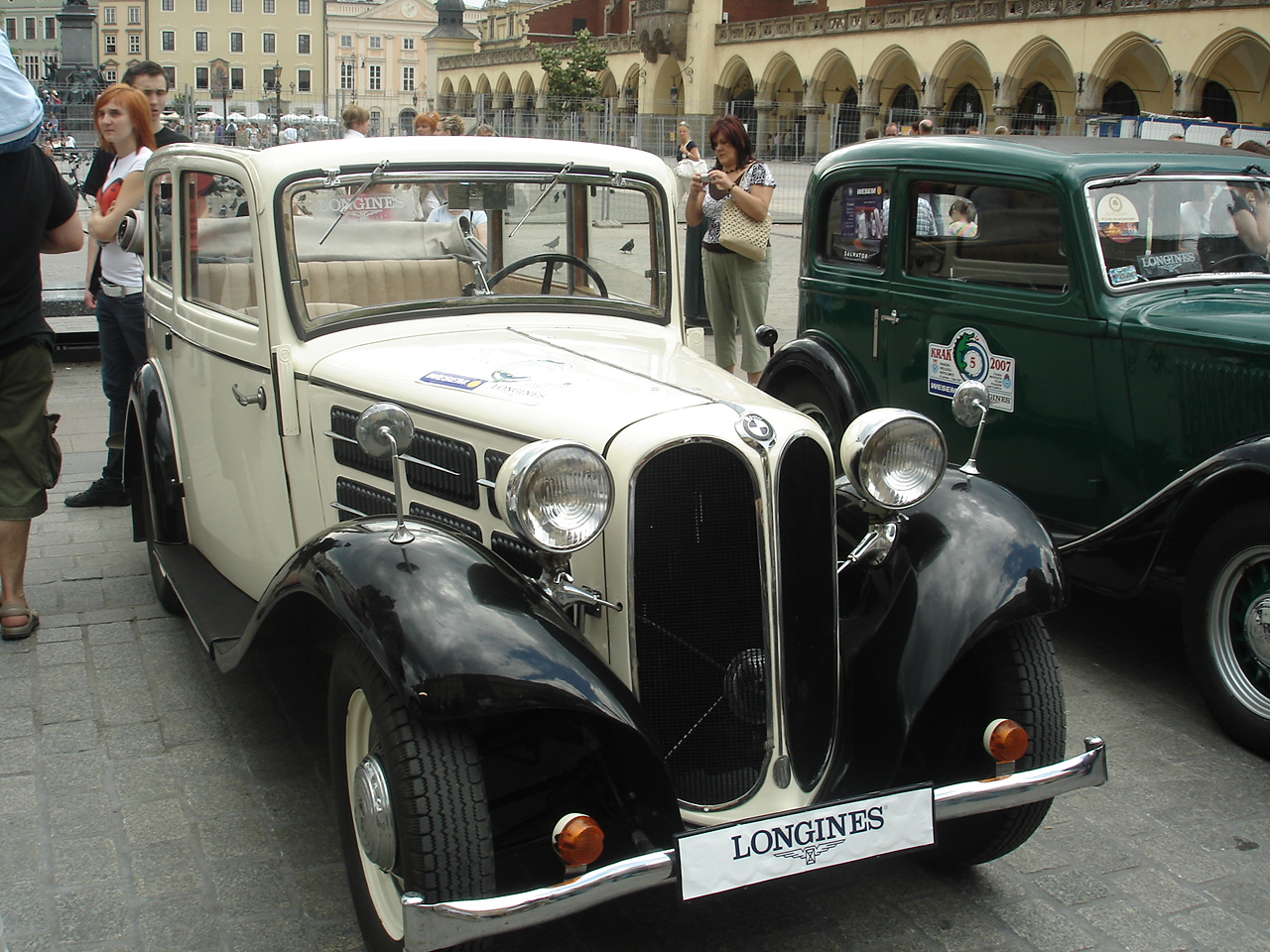
BMW 315

The 315 replaced the 303 in 1934. The 315 differed from the 303 mainly with its larger engine, with increases in both the bore, to 58 mm (2.3 in) from 56 mm (2.2 in), and the stroke, to 94 mm (3.7 in) from 80 mm (3.1 in).

The 319 were introduced in 1935. Produced alongside the 315, the 319 differed from it mainly by its new, larger engine with a bore of 65 mm (2.6 in), and a stroke of 96 mm (3.8 in), resulting in a displacement of 1,911 cc (116.6 cu in). This resulted in an increase in power to 34 kW (45.6 hp) at 3750 rpm. The kerb weight of the 319 was 850 kg (1,874 lb), and the fuel capacity was 40 L (11 US gal; 9 imp gal).

Upon the introduction of the BMW 326 in 1936, the 315 and 319 were no longer BMW's largest cars.

The 315 and 319 were discontinued in 1937. A total of 9,765 BMW 315s were built, including two-door saloon cars, touring cars, convertibles, sport convertibles, and 315/1 roadsters. A total of 6,646 BMW 319s of all types were built by the end of production in 1937.

The 329 replaced the 319 in early 1937. The 329 was basically a 319 with the front bodywork and fenders from the BMW 326. The 329 was available only as a convertible, with either two or four doors. The 329 was replaced by the 326-based BMW 320 later in 1937.

BMW 303-based cars
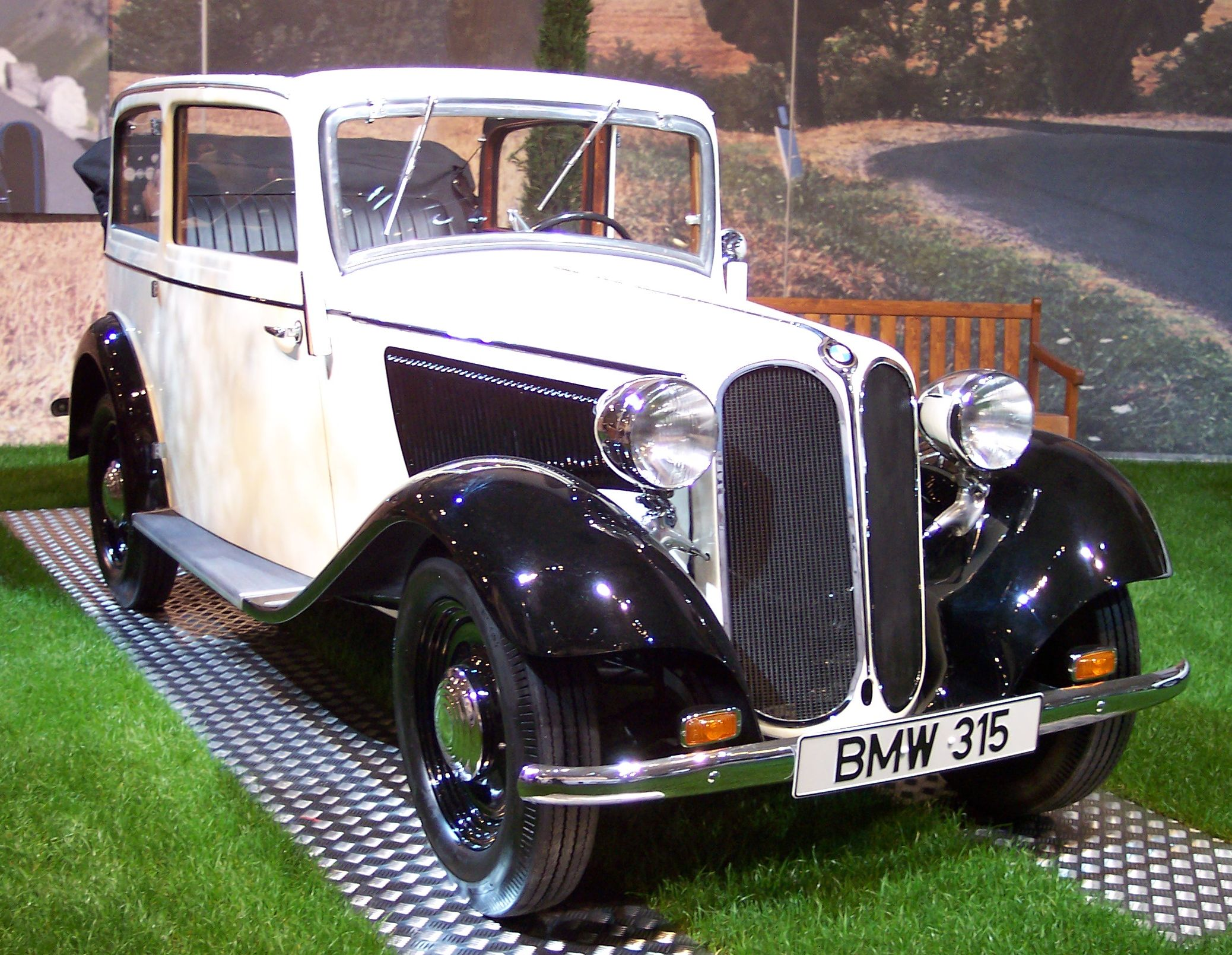
BMW 315

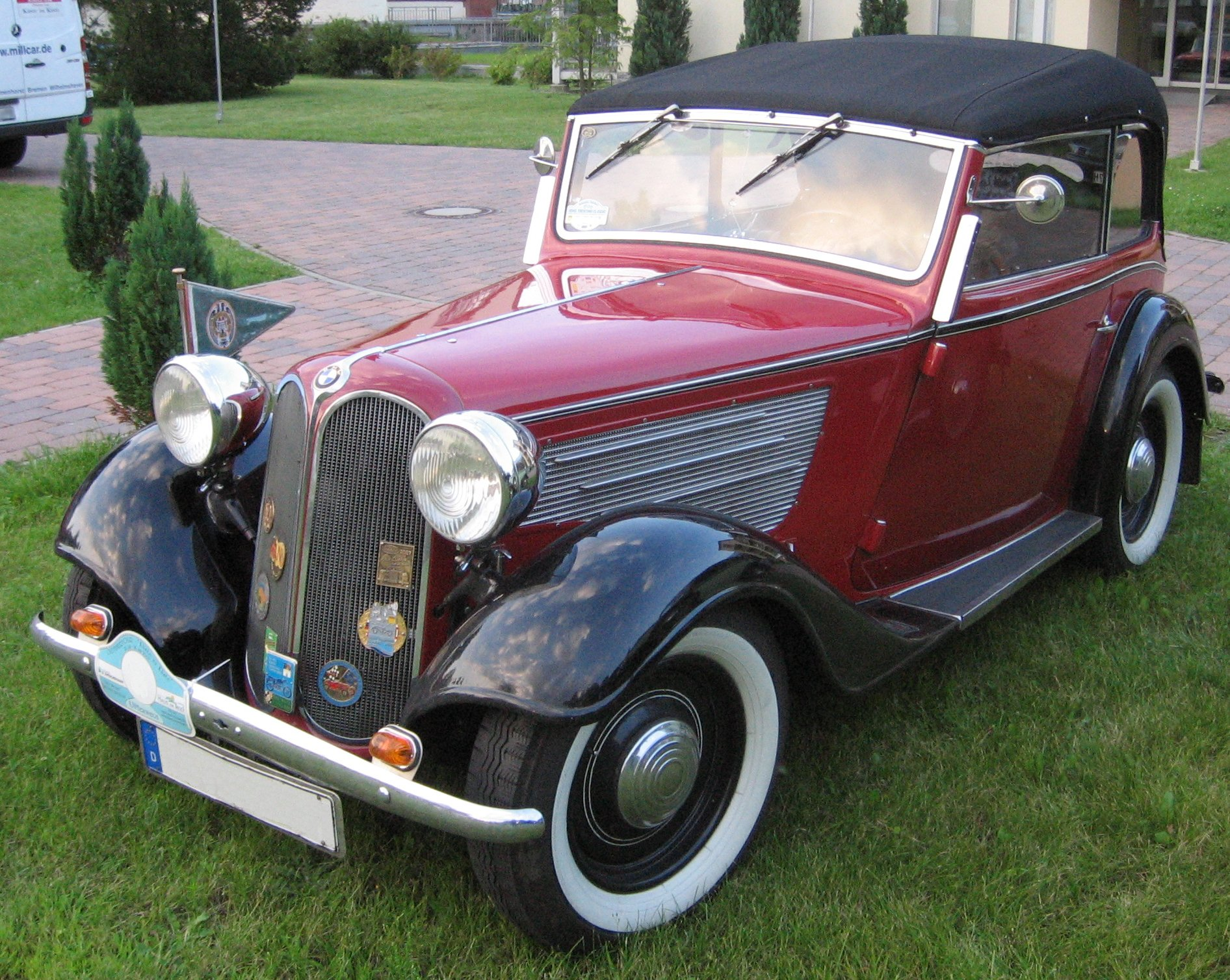
BMW 319 convertible

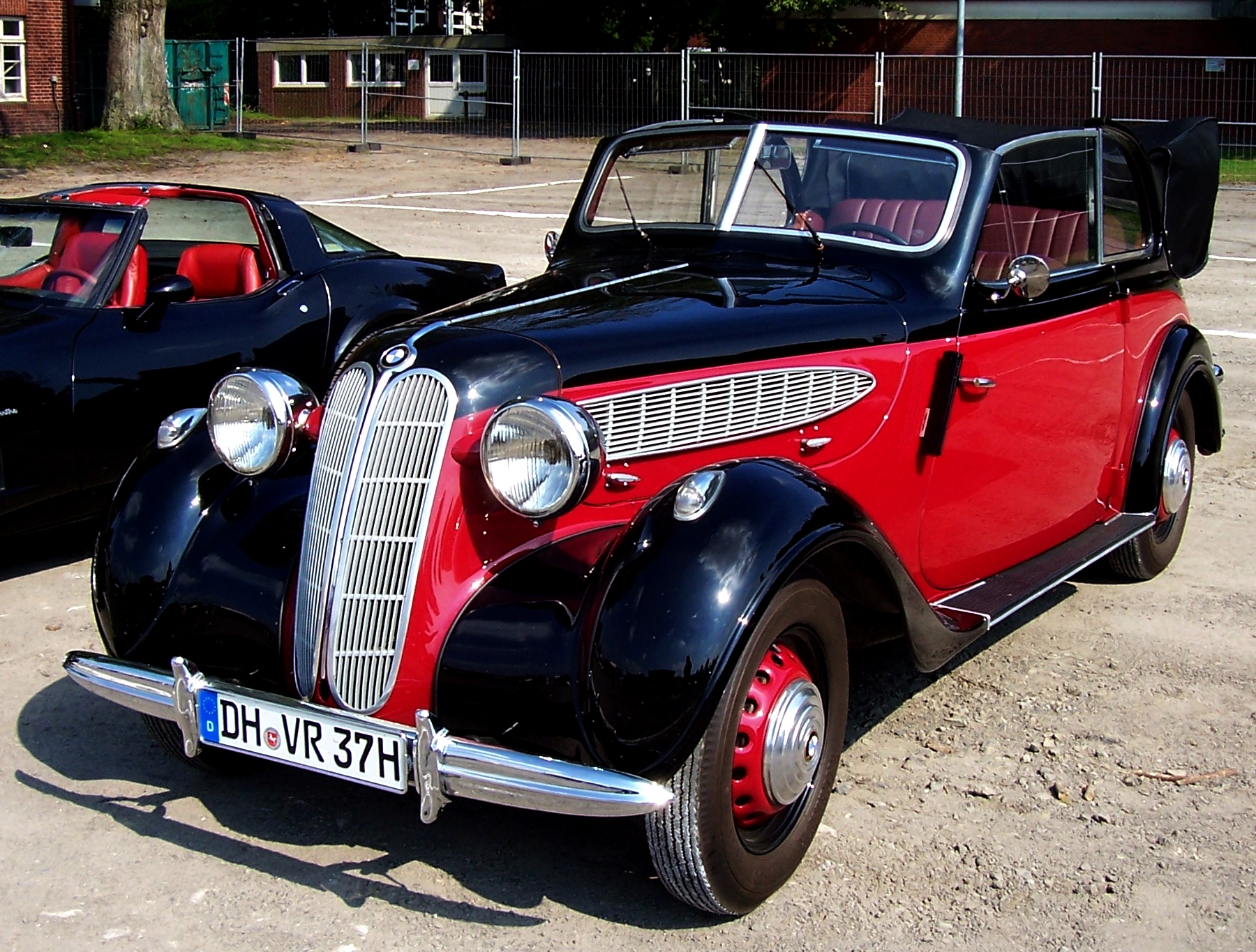
BMW 329

=== 315/1 and 319/1 roadsters ===
BMW 315/1, BMW 319/1
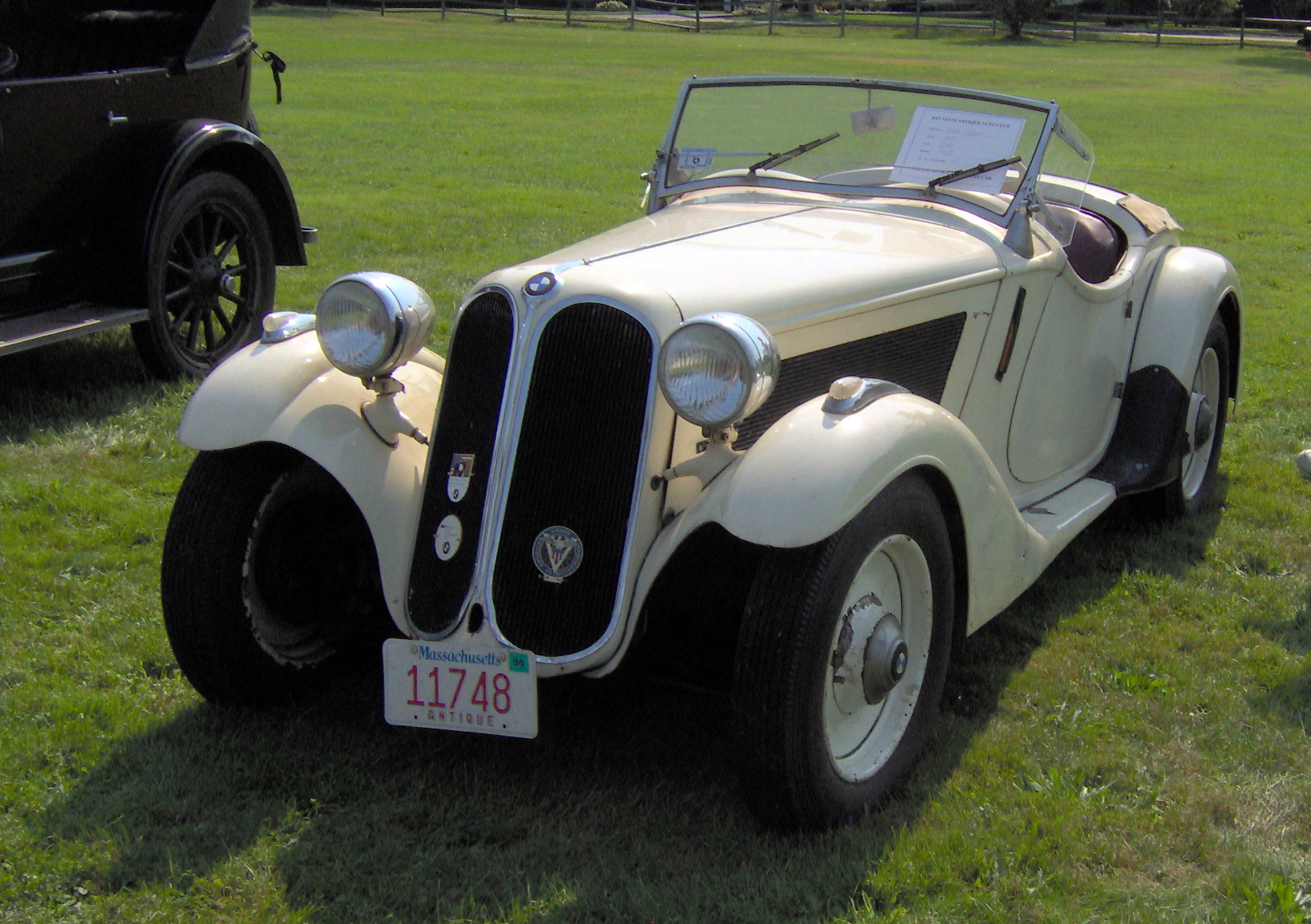
- BMW 315/1 roadster

Overview
- Manufacturer: BMW
- Production: 315/1: 1934–1937; 319/1: 1935–1937
- Assembly: Germany: Eisenach
- Designer: Peter Szymanowski

Body and chassis
- Class: Sports car
- Body style: roadster
- Layout: FR layout
- Related: BMW 319/1; BMW 328

Powertrain
- Engine: BMW M78 OHV I6; 315/1: 1,490 cc (90.9 cu in), 30 kW (41 PS; 40 hp) at 4300 rpm 319/1: 41 kW (55.0 hp) at 4000 rpm
- Transmission: 4-speed manual

Dimensions
- Wheelbase: 2,400 mm (94.5 in)
- Length: 3,800 mm (149.6 in)
- Width: 1,440 mm (56.7 in)
- Height: 1,350 mm (53.1 in)
- Kerb weight: 750 kg (1,653 lb)

Chronology
- Predecessor: BMW Wartburg
- Successor: BMW 328

The BMW 315/1 was a sports car based on the 315 saloon. It used the same chassis as the 315 saloon and had an engine of the same displacement. However, with compression ratio increased to 6.8:1 from 5.6:1 in the saloon, and with the use of three Solex carburetors, power increased to 30 kW (41 PS; 40 hp) at 4300 rpm, while the roadster bodywork reduced kerb weight to 750 kg (1,653 lb).

The BMW 319/1 was a 1.9-litre version of the 315/1 introduced alongside the 319 in 1935. The dimensions of the 319's engine with the performance modification of the 315/1's engine resulted in 41 kW (55.0 hp) at 4000 rpm in the 319/1 roadster.

Production of the 315/1 and 319/1 roadsters ended in 1936, with 242 of the 315/1 roadsters and 102 of the 319/1s built. The 315/1 and 319/1 were replaced by the BMW 328, which was based on an all-new tubular steel ladder frame, but used the steering gear and suspension of the 319/1.

BMW 315/1 and 319/1
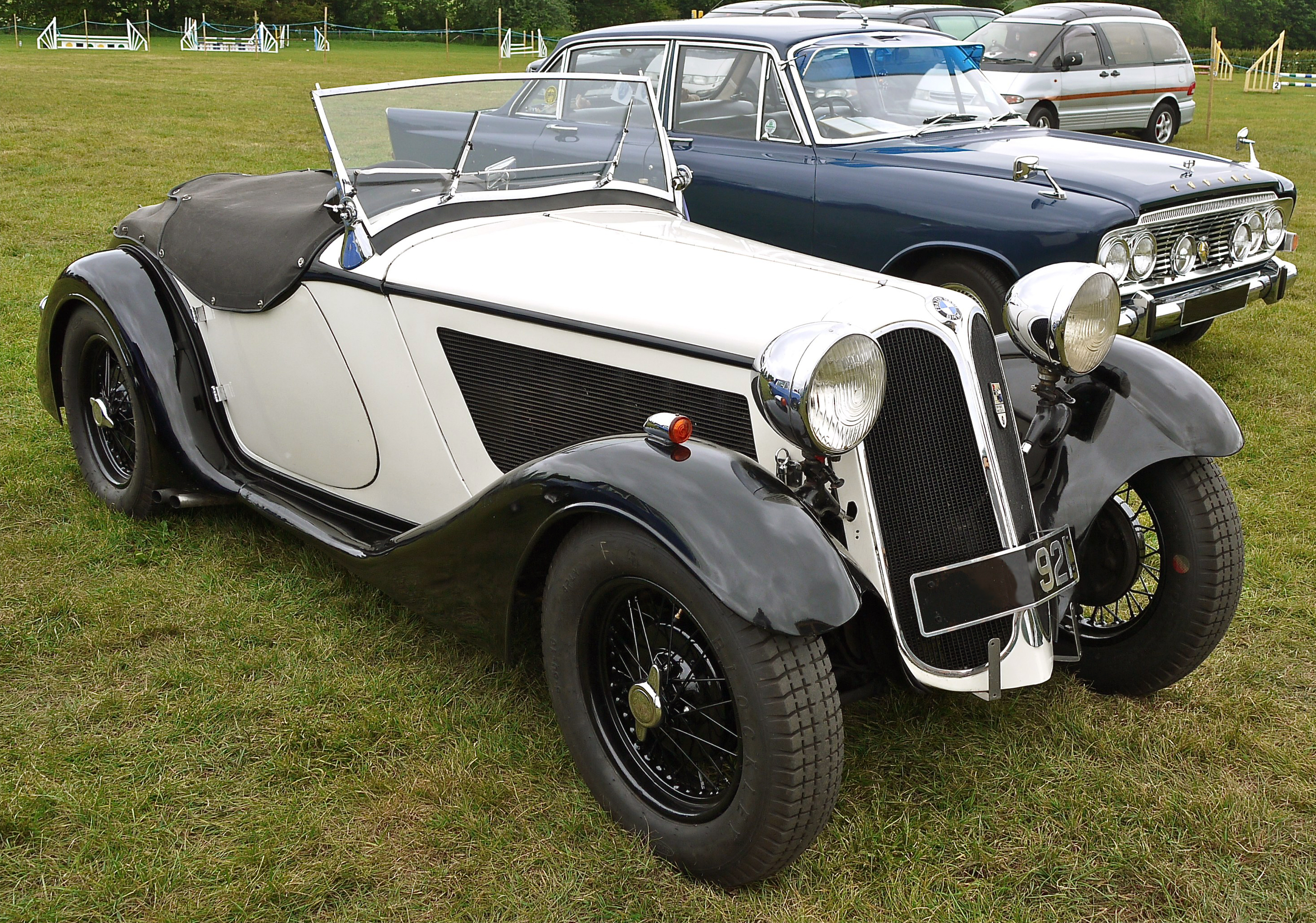
1935 Frazer Nash BMW 315/1 for the UK market

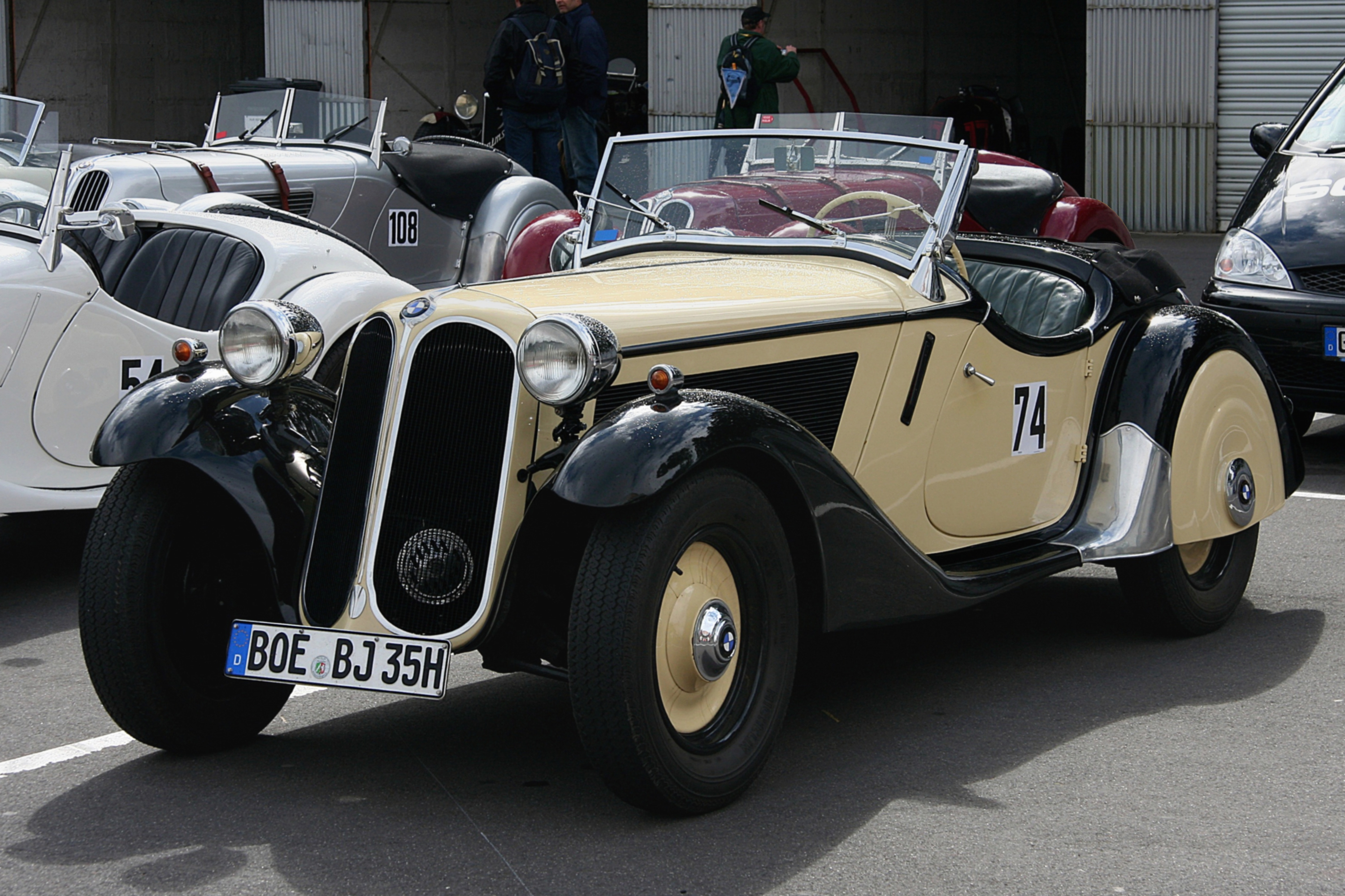
1935 BMW 315/1 sports roadster
