= BMW 3/20 =

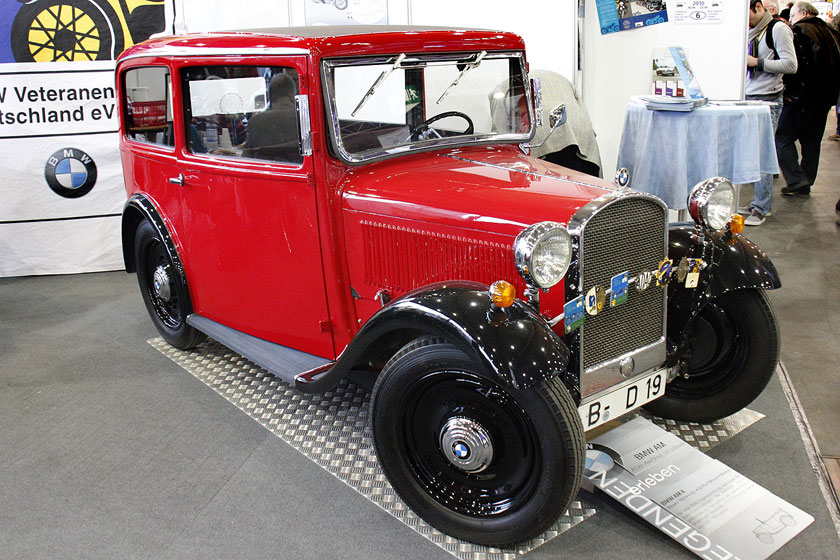

Overview
- Manufacturer: BMW
- Also called: AM-1, AM-2, AM-3, AM-4
- Production: 1932–1934
- Assembly: Germany: Eisenach
- Designer: Alfred Böning

Body and chassis
- Class: City car
- Body style: four seat saloon four seat cabriolet two seat convertible coupé
- Layout: FR layout

Powertrain
- Engine: 788 cc (48.1 cu in) OHV straight-4
- Transmission: 4-speed manual

Dimensions
- Wheelbase: 2,150 mm (84.6 in)
- Length: 3,200 mm (126 in)
- Width: 1,420 mm (56 in)
- Height: 1,550 mm (61 in)
- Kerb weight: 650 kg (1,433 lb) with saloon body

Chronology
- Predecessor: BMW 3/15
- Successor: BMW 309

The BMW 3/20 PS was the first BMW automobile designed entirely by BMW. It was manufactured from 1932 to 1934, replacing the 3/15 model that was initially an Austin 7 manufactured under licence from the Austin Motor Company.

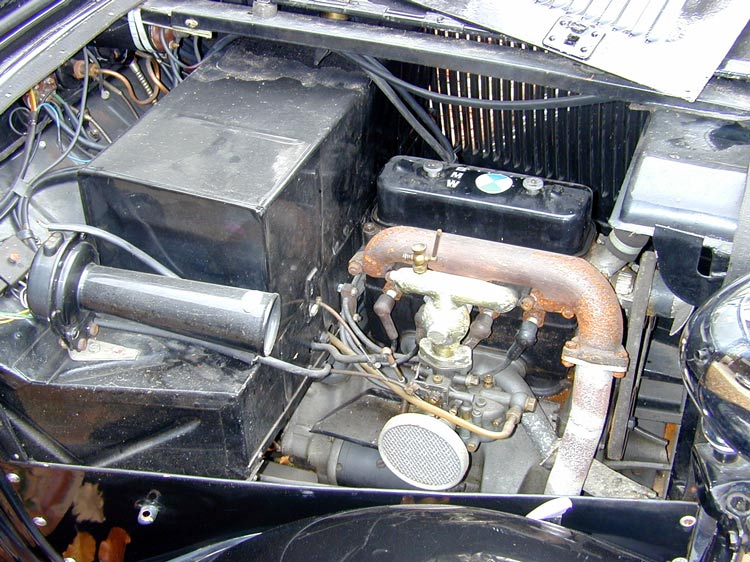
BMW 3/20 AM 4 engine

The engine used in the 3/20 was based on the Austin Seven engine used in the 3/15, but its crankshaft ran in plain bearings instead of roller bearings and had an 80 mm (3.1 in) stroke, generating a displacement of 788 cc (48.1 cu in). The new engine design also had a water pump and an overhead valve cylinder head. These design changes caused the engine to generate 20 hp, but did not change the taxable horsepower rating of 3 PS, thus giving the model designation 3/20.

The 3/20 was larger than the 3/15, with an 84.6 in (2,149 mm) wheelbase and a body 3 in (76 mm) lower than the 3/15. The 3/20 used a backbone frame unrelated to the 3/15's Austin Seven "A" frame. It inherited the 3/15 DA-4's independent front suspension and added a swing axle independent rear suspension, using a transverse leaf spring similar to that used at the front. The standard bodies for the car were built by Daimler-Benz in Sindelfingen.

Journalist and engineer Josef Ganz, who had criticized the 3/15 DA-4's suspension system in the magazine Motor-Kritik, was contracted in July 1931 as a consultant in the design of the 3/20 AM-1.

Four versions of the 3/20 were built: AM 1, AM 2, AM 3 and AM 4, where AM denoted Automobil München.
