= History of BMW =

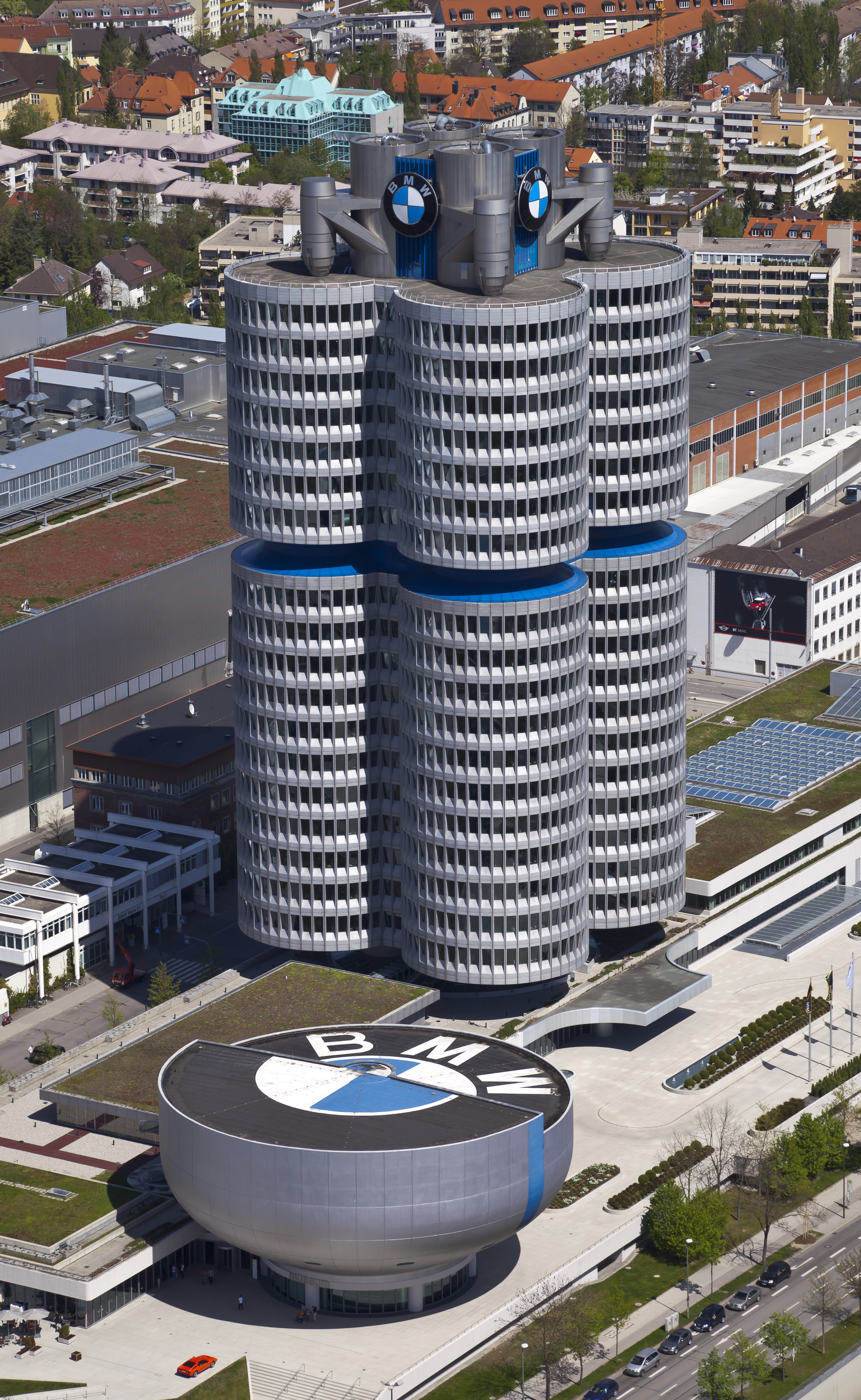
BMW Headquarters in Munich

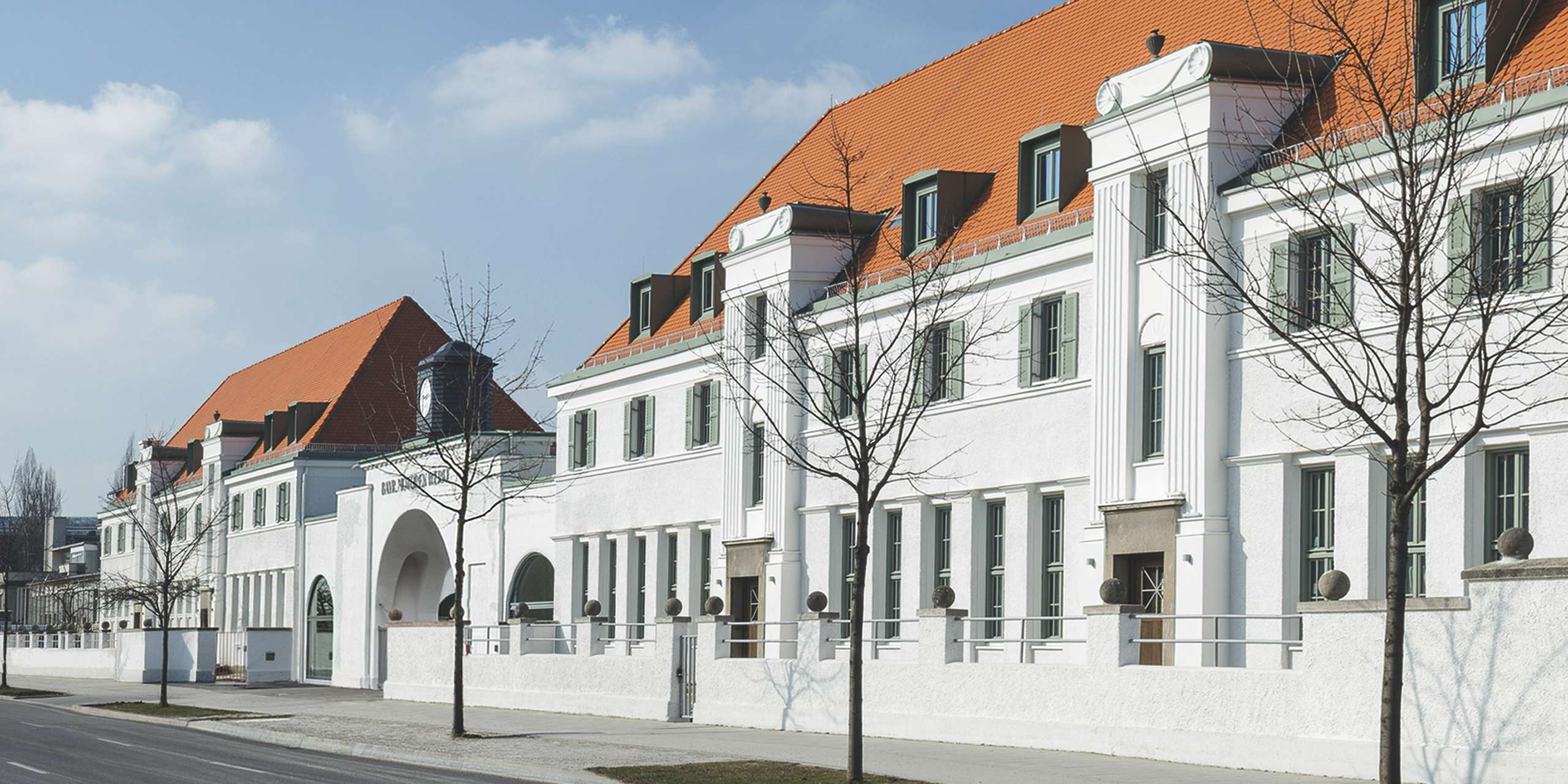
BMW Group Classic in Munich

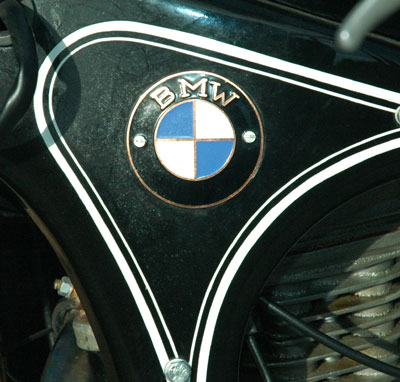
BMW logo on a 1939 motorcycle

The official founding date of the German motor vehicle manufacturer BMW is 7 March 1916, when an aircraft producer called Bayerische Flugzeugwerke (formerly Otto Flugmaschinenfabrik) was established. This company was renamed to Bayerische Motoren Werke (BMW) in 1922. However, the BMW name dates back to 1917, when Rapp Motorenwerke changed its name to Bayerische Motoren Werke. BMW's first product was a straight-six aircraft engine called the BMW IIIa. Following the end of World War I, BMW remained in business by producing motorcycle engines, farm equipment, household items and railway brakes.

This was not enough and the company was suspended, effectively bankrupt, from 6 November 1918 to 1 February 1919. BMW turned to motorcycle engine manufacturing, building a smooth operating horizontally opposed engine to keep the centre of mass low and thus make a more responsive machine. The engine was well received but the motorcycles made using it were not and sold slowly. BMW's General Director Franz Josef Popp had to branch out again and BMW became a sub-contract manufacturer for braking system manufacturer Knorr Bremse.

The major shareholder in BMW, Vienna based Italian speculator Camillo Castiglionli, sold all of his shares to Knorr Bremse in May 1920, who then acquired the remaining shares to make BMW a wholly owned subsidiary still run by Popp. Less than two years later Popp persuaded Castiglionli buy back the BMW company name and buy the Bayerische Flugzeugwerke for its production site on the other side of the air field. There the company produced its first motorcycle in 1923. This was the legendary Max Fritz designed BMW R32 shaft drive motorcycle, which featured an integrated gearbox, recirculating rather than total loss lubrication and with the cylinder heads poking out for cooling.

BMW became an automobile manufacturer in 1928 when it purchased Fahrzeugfabrik Eisenach, which built Austin Sevens at that time under licence (under the Dixi marque). The first car sold as a BMW was a rebadged Dixi called the BMW 3/15. Throughout the 1930s, BMW expanded its range into sports cars and larger luxury cars.

Aircraft engines, motorcycles, and automobiles would be BMW's main products until World War II. During the war, against the wishes of Popp, BMW concentrated on aircraft engine production, with military motorcycles as a side line, and automobile manufacture stopped altogether in 1941, under government prohibition. BMW's factories were heavily bombed during the war, its automobile factory in the Russian controlled East Germany and its remaining West German facilities were banned from producing motor vehicles or aircraft after the war. Again, the company survived by making pots, pans and bicycles. In 1948, BMW restarted motorcycle production. BMW resumed car production in Bavaria in 1952 with the BMW 501 luxury saloon. The range of cars was expanded in 1955, through the production of the cheaper Isetta microcar after acquiring the rights from Italian company Iso. Slow sales of loss making luxury cars, declining profitable motorcycle sales as the economy improved and small profit margins from microcars meant BMW was in serious financial trouble. A "600" 4 seat version of the Isetta, with the "fridge" front door and one side door and a 600 cc air cooled horizontal twin motorcycle engine, was a sales flop. This led to a "proper car" styled by Micholetti based on the 600 was developed but consumed all available fund leading to very limited production in 1959. In December 1959, the company was nearly taken over by rival Daimler-Benz. Herbert Quandt and Harald Quandt acquired a controlling interest, largely based on the sales prospect of the 700 resulted in the company surviving as a separate entity.

The Quandts’ father, Günther Quandt, was a well-known German industrialist. Quandt joined the Nazi party in 1933 and made a fortune arming the German Wehrmacht, manufacturing weapons and batteries. Many of his enterprises had been appropriated from Jewish owners under duress and with minimal compensation. At least three of his enterprises made extensive use of slave laborers, as many as 50,000 in all. One of his battery factories had its own on-site concentration camp, complete with gallows. While the Quandt family and BMW were not directly connected during the war, funds amassed in the Nazi era by his father allowed Herbert Quandt to buy BMW.

The BMW 700 was successful and assisted in the company's recovery.

The 1962 introduction of the BMW New Class compact sedans was the beginning of BMW's reputation as a leading manufacturer of sport-oriented cars. Throughout the 1960s, BMW expanded its range by adding coupe and luxury sedan models. The BMW 5 Series mid-size sedan range was introduced in 1972, followed by the BMW 3 Series compact sedans in 1975, the BMW 6 Series luxury coupes in 1976 and the BMW 7 Series large luxury sedans in 1978.

The BMW M division released its first road car, a mid-engine supercar, in 1978. This was followed by the BMW M5 in 1984 and the BMW M3 in 1986. Also in 1986, BMW introduced its first V12 engine in the 750i luxury sedan.

The company purchased the Rover Group in 1994, but the takeover was not successful and caused BMW large financial losses. In 2000, BMW sold off most of the Rover brands, retaining only Mini. BMW acquired the rights to the Rolls-Royce brand in 1998.

The 1995 BMW Z3 expanded the line-up to include a mass-production two-seat roadster, and the 1999 BMW X5 was the company's entry into the SUV market.

Their first mass-produced turbocharged petrol engine was introduced in 1980 (m102), with most engines switching over to turbocharging over the following decade. The first hybrid BMW was the 2010 BMW ActiveHybrid 7, and BMW's first electric car was the BMW i3 city car, which was released in 2013. After many years of establishing a reputation for sporting rear-wheel drive cars, BMW's first front-wheel drive car was the 2014 BMW 2 Series Active Tourer multi-purpose vehicle (MPV).

== Aircraft and industrial engines ==
=== 1913–1918: World War I ===
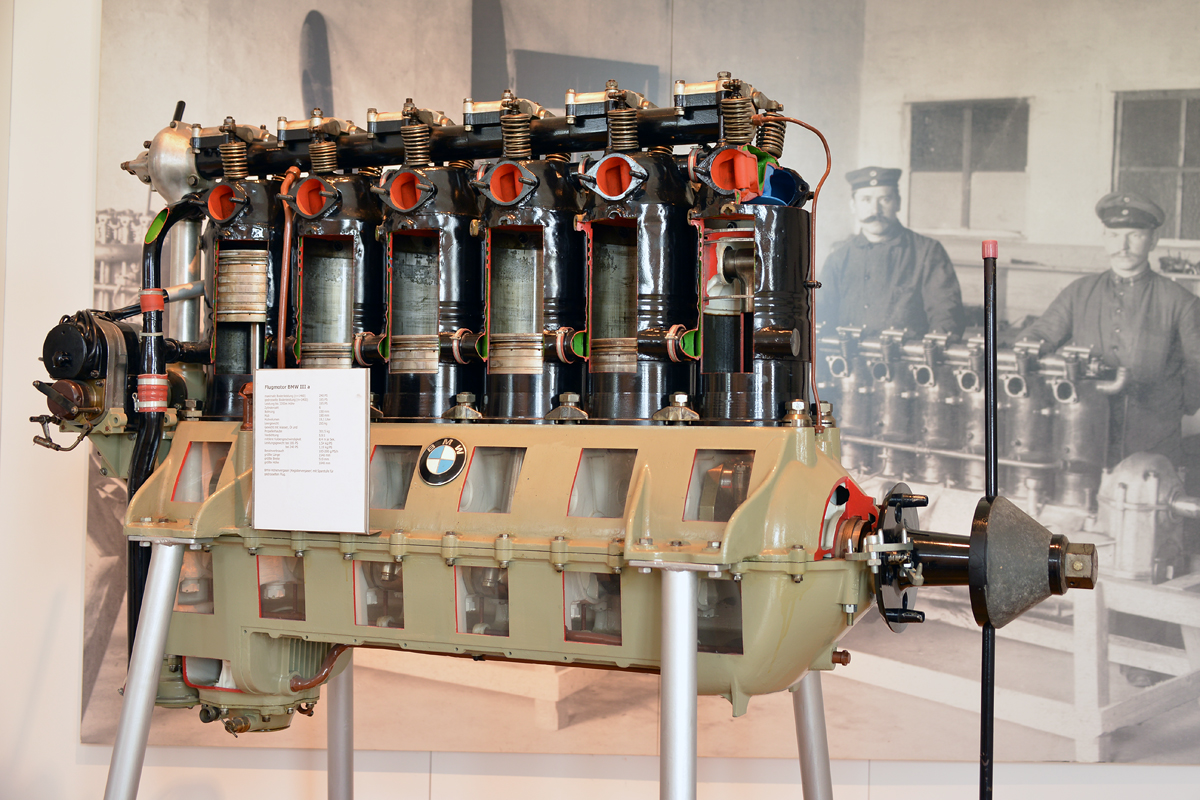
1917 BMW IIIa aircraft engine

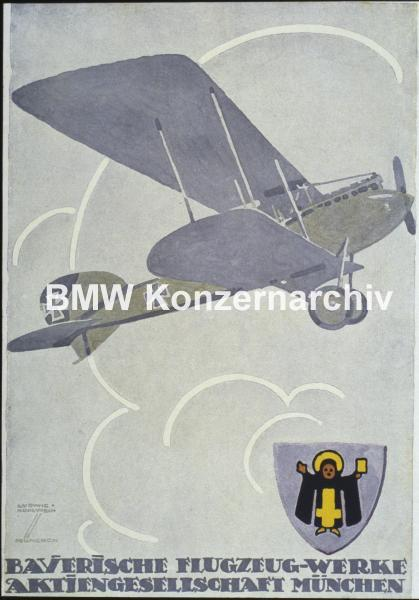
1916 advertisement for Bayerische Flugzeugwerke

BMW's origins can be traced back to three separate German companies: Rapp Motorenwerke, Bayerische Flugzeugwerke and Fahrzeugfabrik Eisenach.

The history of the name itself begins with Rapp Motorenwerke, an aircraft engine manufacturer which was established in 1913 by Karl Rapp. A site near the Oberwiesenfeld was chosen because it was close to Bayerische Flugzeugwerke (then called Otto Flugmaschinenfabrik), with whom he had contracts to supply his four-cylinder aircraft engines. Rapp was also sub-contracted by Austro-Daimler to manufacture their V12 aircraft engines, under the supervision of Franz Josef Popp, who was delegated to Munich from Vienna. Popp did not restrict himself to the role of observer, becoming actively involved in the overall management of the company.

In April 1917, following founder Karl Rapp's departure, Rapp Motorenwerke was renamed to Bayerische Motoren Werke (BMW). BMW's first product was the BMW IIIa aircraft engine. The IIIa engine was known for good fuel economy and high-altitude performance. The resulting orders for IIIa engines from the German military caused rapid expansion for BMW. The large orders received from the Luftstreitkrafte for the BMW IIIa engine were overwhelming for the small company, however government officials in the relevant ministries were able to give BMW extensive practical support for the rapid expansion and funding to build a new factory near BMW's existing workshops. The German Empire did not, however, wish to go on supporting BMW with loans and guarantees, and therefore urged the flotation of a public limited company.

The name change to Bayerische Motoren Werke compelled management to devise a new logo for the company, and the famous BMW logo was designed at this time. However, they remained true to the imagery of the previous Rapp Motorenwerke emblem. Thus, both the old and the new emblems were built up in the same way – the company name was placed in a black circle, which was once again given a pictorial form by placing a symbol within it. By analogy with this, the blue and white panels of the Bavarian national flag were placed at the center of the BMW logo. Not until the late 1920s was the logo lent a new interpretation as representing a rotating propeller.

BMW's corporate history considers the founding date of Bayerische Flugzeugwerke (7 March 1916) to be the birth of the company.

=== 1918–1923: Post-war aftermath ===
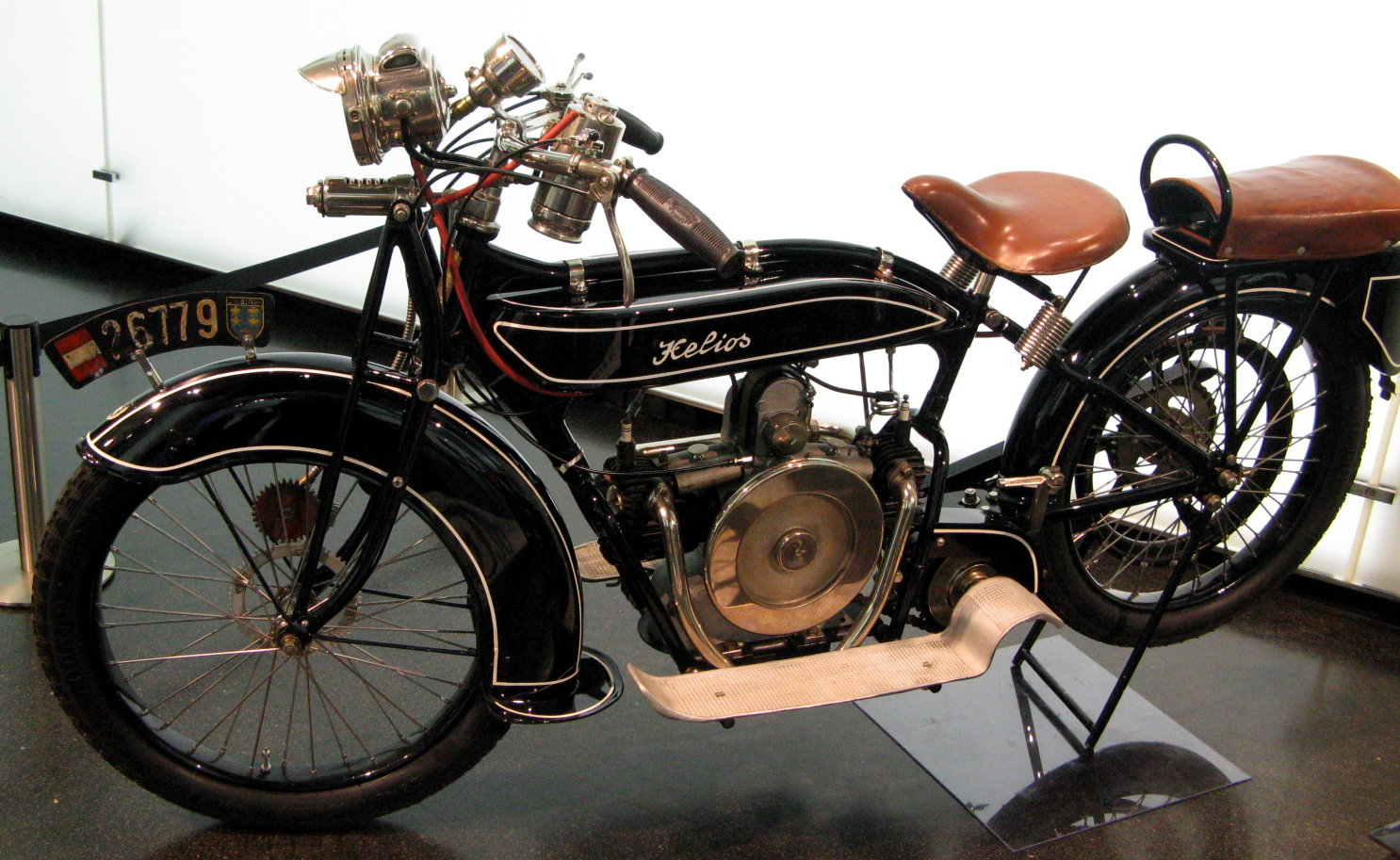
BFw Helios motorcycle

After the end of World War I in 1918, BMW was forced to cease aircraft engine production by the terms of the Treaty of Versailles. At the time, Max Wiedmann held about 80 percent of the shares in BMW, the majority of which were obtained from his father-in-law Julius Auspitzer. Following Wiedmann's capitulation, the company was renamed from BMW GmbH to BMW AG and registered as a company on 13 August 1918, taking over the manufacturing assets, order book and workforce from BMW GmbH. The shares in BMW AG were owned by the Viennese financier Camillo Castiglioni (33%), the Nuremberg industrialist Fritz Neumeyer (33%), Bayerische Bank (17%) and Norddeutsche Bank (17%). To remain in business, BMW produced farm equipment, household items and railway brakes. The BMW M2B15 industrial engine was also used in various motorcycles, including the 1920 Helios model built by Bayerische Flugzeugwerke (which would later merge with BMW).

This was not enough and BMW became a sub-contract manufacturer for braking system manufacturer Süddeutsche Bremsen-AG, now known as Knorr-Bremse

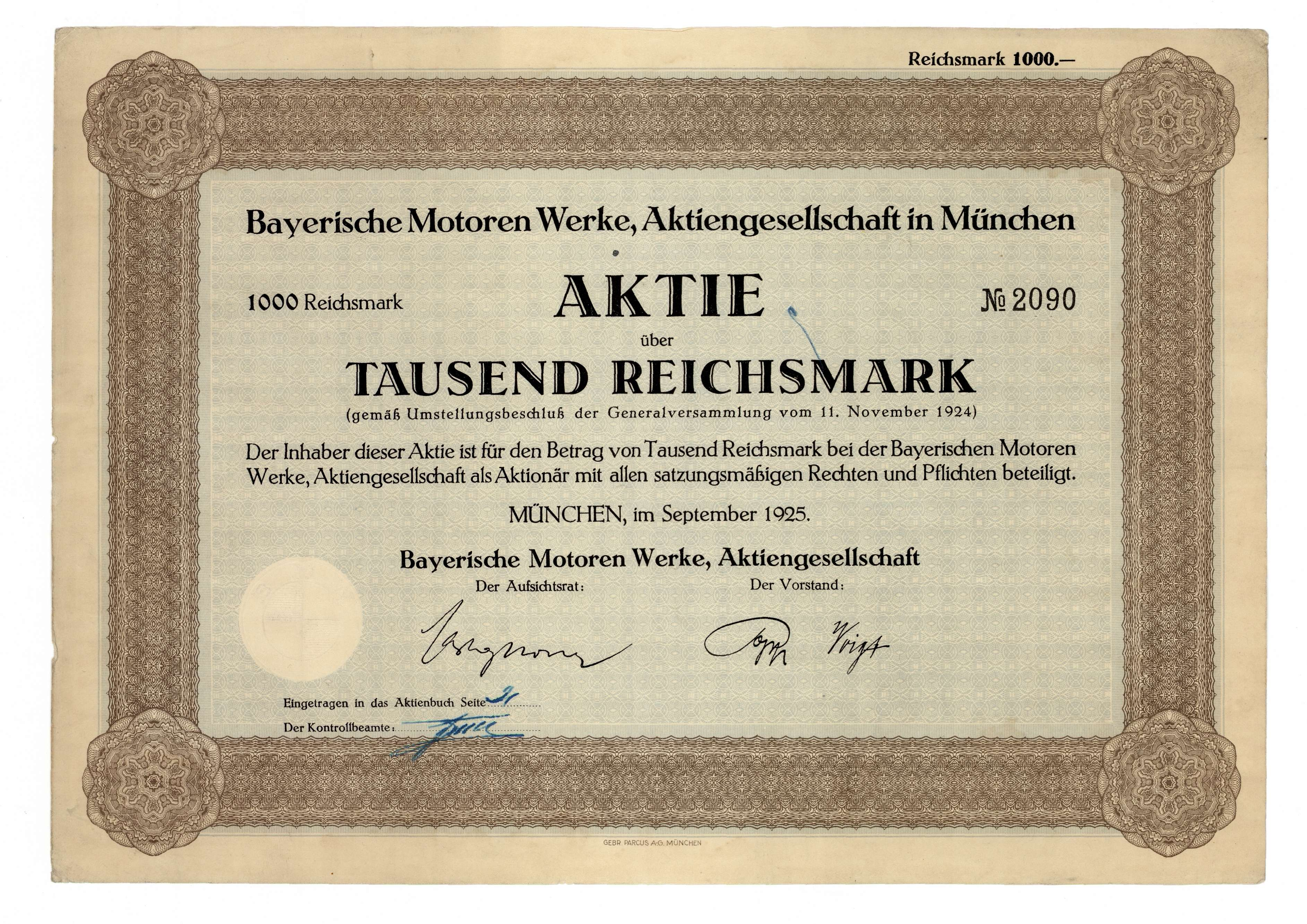
Share of the Bayerische Motoren Werke AG, issued September 1925, signated by Camillo Castiglioni as member of the supervisory board

On 20 May 1922, Camillo Castiglioni purchased back the rights to the name BMW for 75 million reichsmarks. Castiglioni was also an investor in another aircraft company, called Bayerische Flugzeugwerke (formerly Otto Flugmaschinenfabrik), which he renamed to Bayerische Motoren Werke AG. The disused factory of Bayerische Flugzeugwerke on Lerchenauer Straße was re-opened to produce engines for buses, trucks, farm equipment and pumps under the BMW brand name. BMW's headquarters have been at that location ever since.

=== 1939–1945: World War II ===
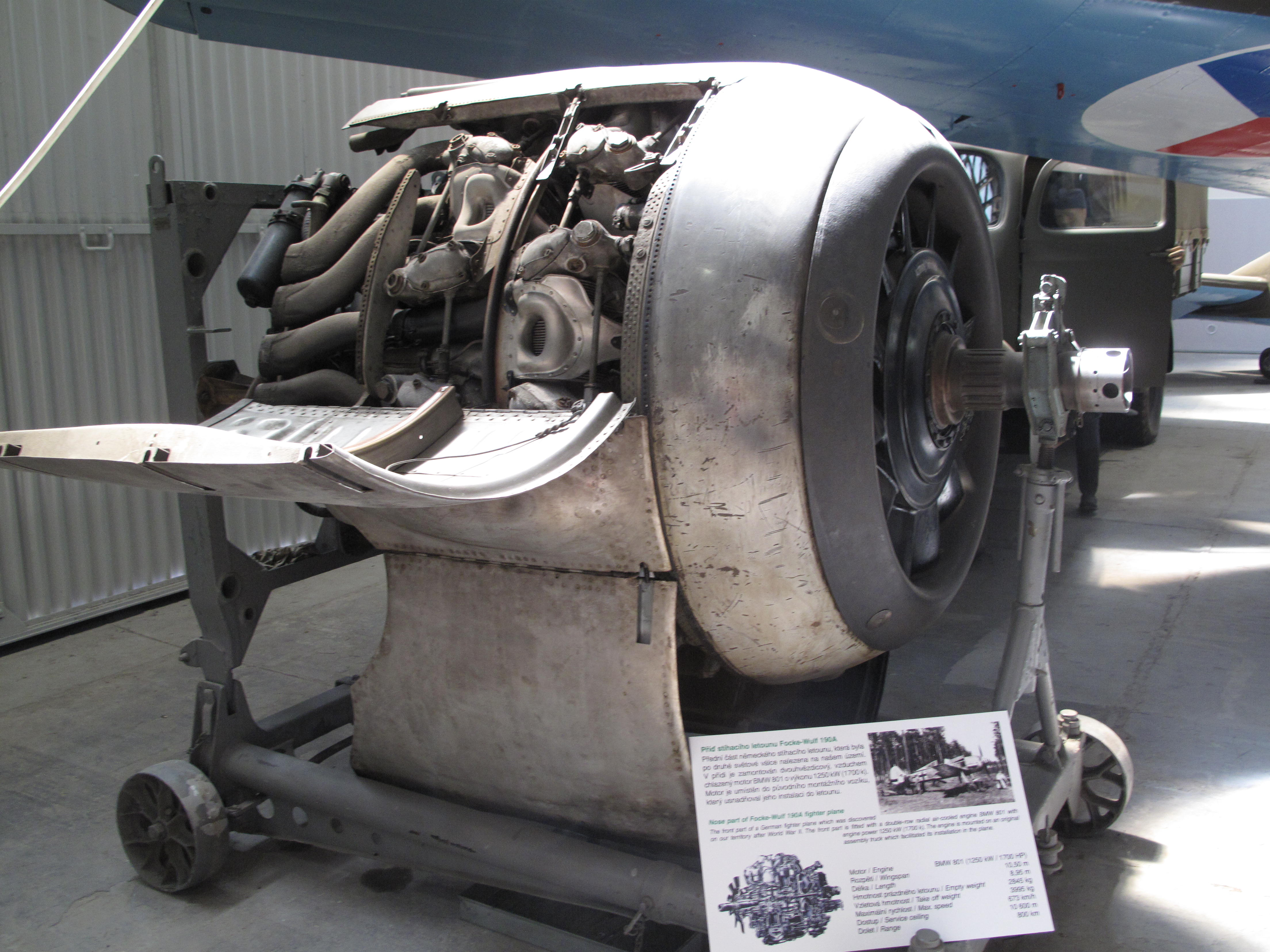
BMW 801 radial engine

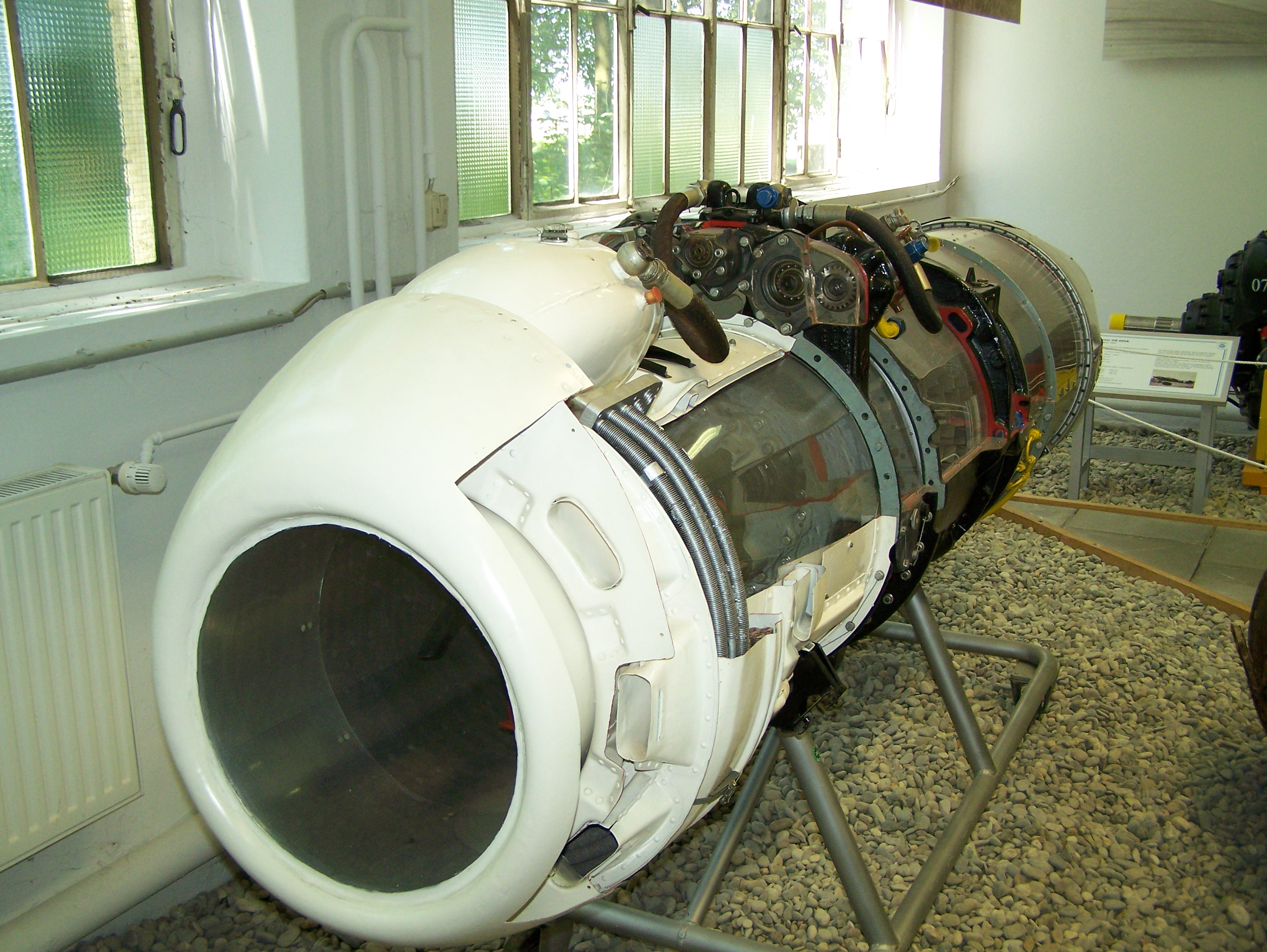
BMW 003 jet engine

With German rearmament in the 1930s, the company again began producing aircraft engines for the Luftwaffe. In 1939, BMW bought Brandenburgische Motorenwerke, also known as Bramo, from the Siemens group of companies and merged it with its aircraft engine division under the name BMW Flugmotorenbau GmbH. A new factory at Allach, outside Munich, began production of aircraft engines later that year. Over 30,000 aero engines were manufactured through 1945, as well as over 500 jet engines such as the BMW 003. To enable this massive production effort, forced labor was utilized, consisting primarily of prisoners from concentration camps such as Dachau and Munich-Allach. By the end of the war, almost 50% of the 50,000-person workforce at BMW AG consisted of prisoners from concentration camps.

Among its successful World War II engine designs were the BMW 132 and BMW 801 air-cooled radial engines, and the pioneering BMW 003 axial-flow turbojet. Towards the end of the Third Reich, BMW developed some military aircraft projects for the Luftwaffe— the Strahlbomber, Schnellbomber and Strahljäger— but none of them reached production.

== Motorcycles ==
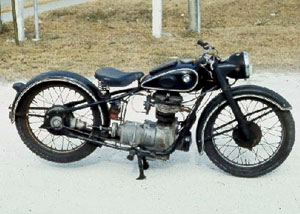
BMW R24

BMW's motorcycle history began in 1921 when the company commenced manufacturing engines for other companies. BMW's own motorcycles— sold under the BMW Motorrad brand— began in 1923 with the BMW R 32, which was powered by a flat-twin engine (also called a "boxer-twin" engine). Production of motorcycles with flat-twin engines continues to this day, however BMW has also produced many models with other types of engine.

== Automobiles ==
=== 1923–1939: Start of production ===
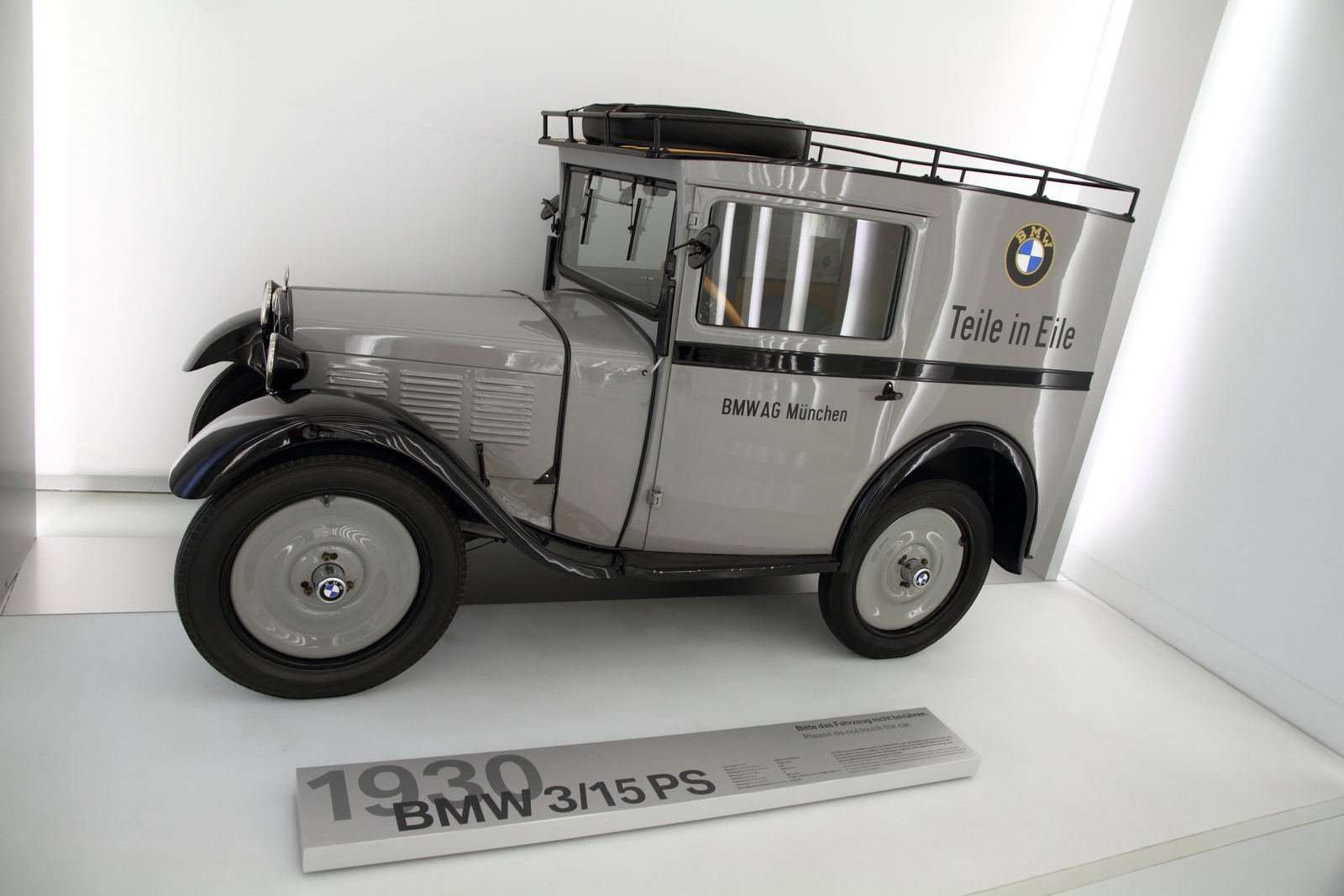
BMW 3/15PS (1928-1931)

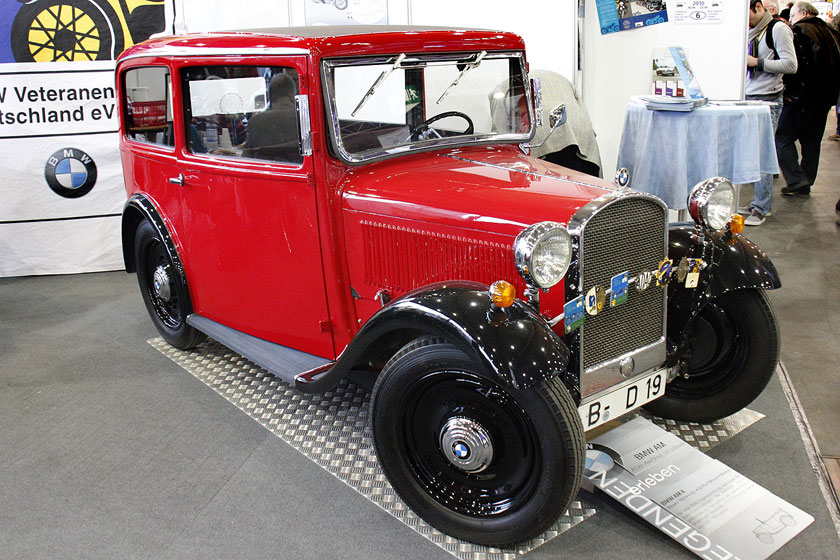
BMW 3/20 (1932-1934)

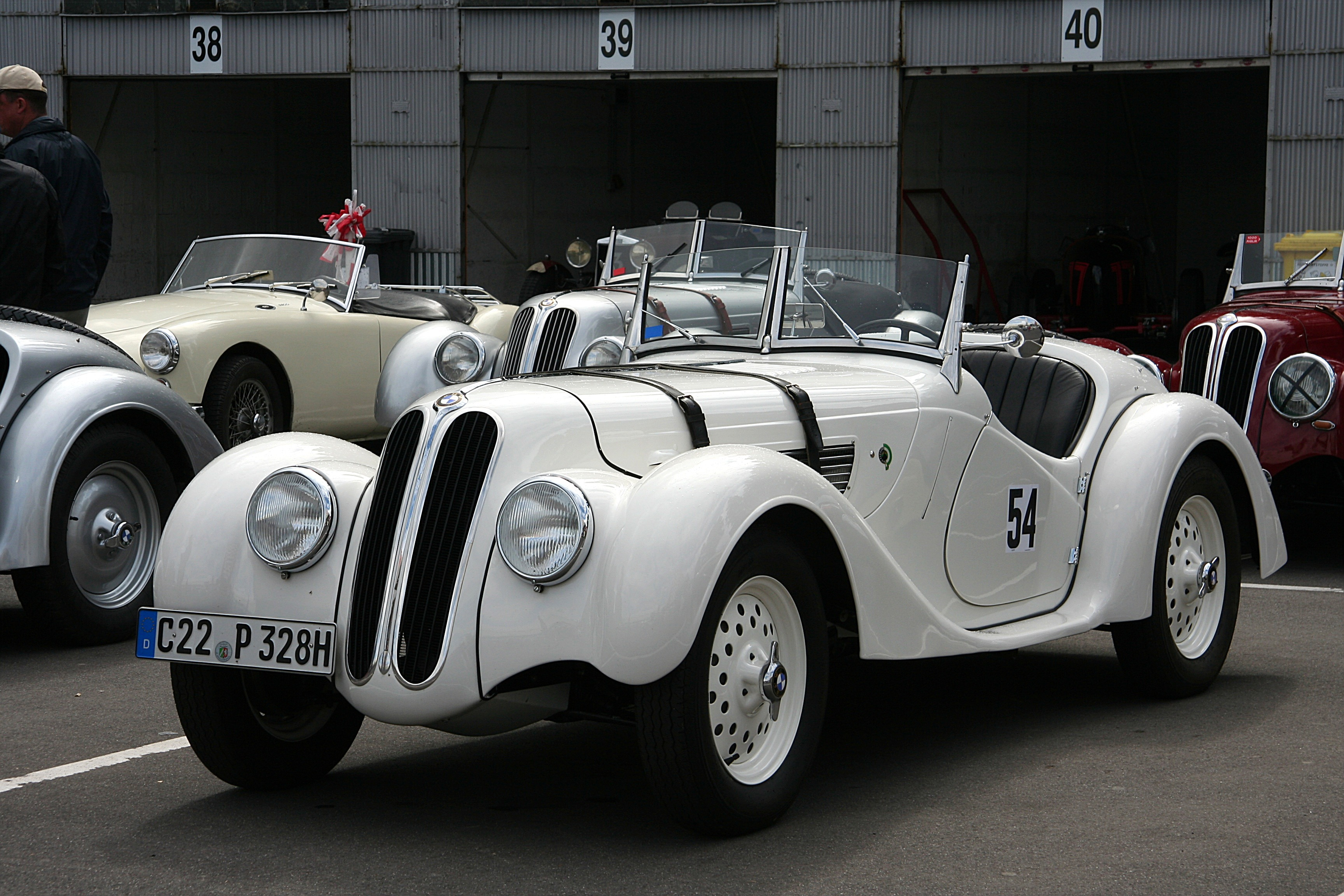
BMW 328 (1936-1940)

BMW's production of automobiles began in 1928, when the company purchased the Automobilwerk Eisenach car company from Gothaer Waggonfabrik. Eisenach's current model was the Dixi 3/15, a licensed copy of the Austin 7 which had begun production in 1927. Following the takeover, the Dixi 3/15 became the BMW 3/15, BMW's first production car. Towards the end of 1930, BMW attempted to introduce a new front axle with independent wheel suspension for both their models, the BMW 'Dixi' 3/15 DA4 and BMW 'Wartburg' DA3, but this resulted in accidents with the prototypes because of construction faults.

In 1932, the BMW 3/20 became the first BMW automobile designed entirely by BMW. It was powered by a four-cylinder engine, which BMW designed based on the Austin 7 engine.

BMW's first automotive straight-six engine was released in 1933, in the BMW 303, which was larger and more conventional than its 3/20 predecessor. The 303 was also the first BMW to use the "kidney grille" that would become a characteristic of BMW styling. The 303 formed the basis for the four-cylinder 309 and the larger-engined 315 and 319, while the 315/1 and 319/1 roadsters were built using the chassis of the 303. and the restyled 329.

The 303 platform was supplemented in 1936 by the BMW 326, a larger luxury car with a more rigid frame. The 326 was BMW's first four-door sedan. A shortened version of the 326 chassis was used in the BMW 320 (which replaced the 329), the BMW 321 (which replaced the 320) and in the BMW 327 coupé.

Also in 1936, the BMW 328 sports car replaced the 315/1 and 319/1. Unlike its predecessors, the 328 had a purpose-built chassis and a unique engine (the BMW M328) which produced 59 kW (79 bhp; 80 PS). From its introduction at the Eifelrennen race at the Nürburgring in 1936, where Ernst Henne drove it to win the 2.0 litre class, to the overall victory of Fritz Huschke von Hanstein at the 1940 Brescia Grand Prix during World War II. The 328 was highly successful in motor racing, with more than 100 class wins in 1937 alone.

The BMW 335 luxury car was produced from 1939 to 1941. It was built using an extended version of the 326 chassis with the larger BMW M335 straight-six engine.

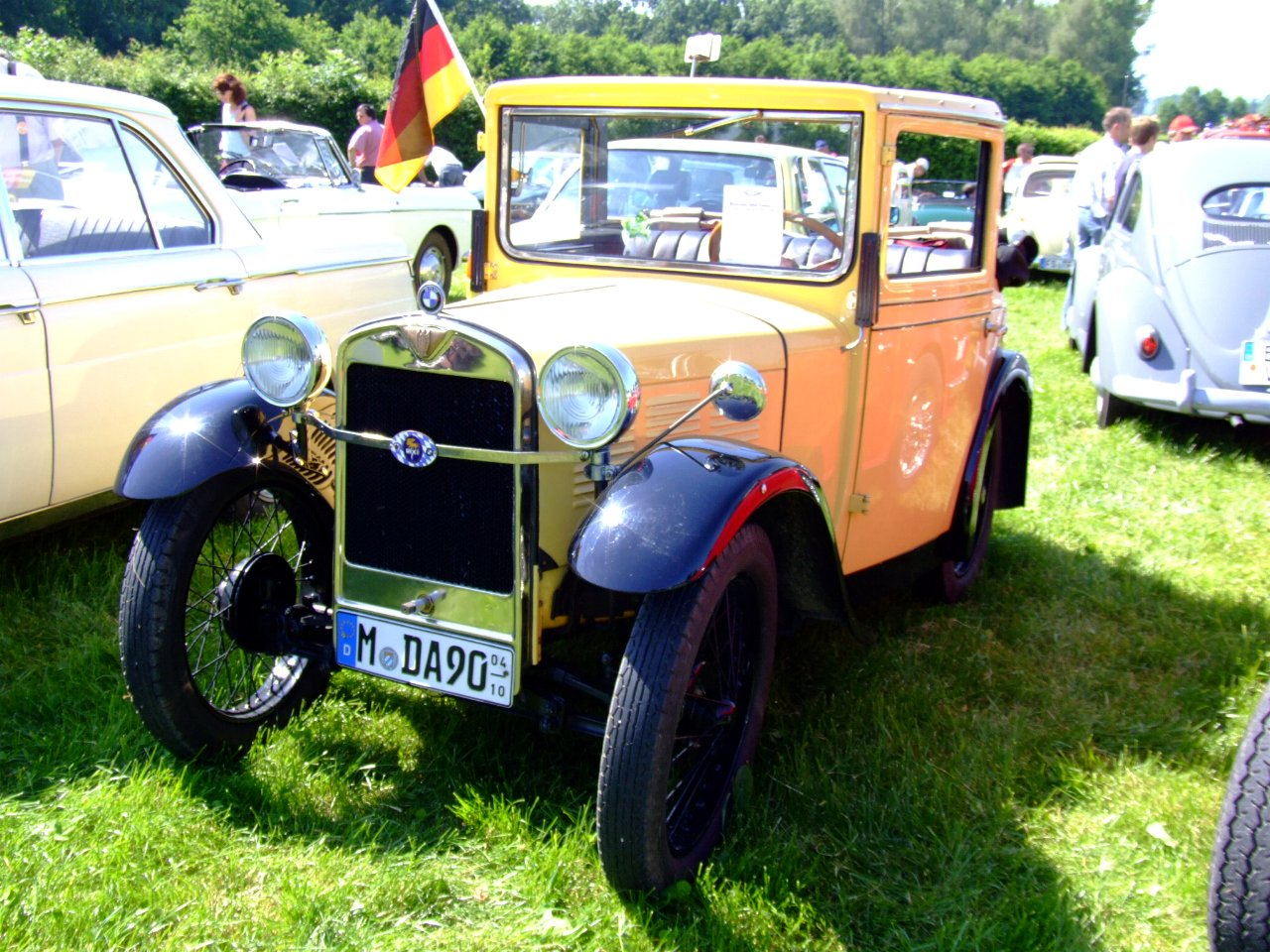
BMW 3/15PS (1928-1931)

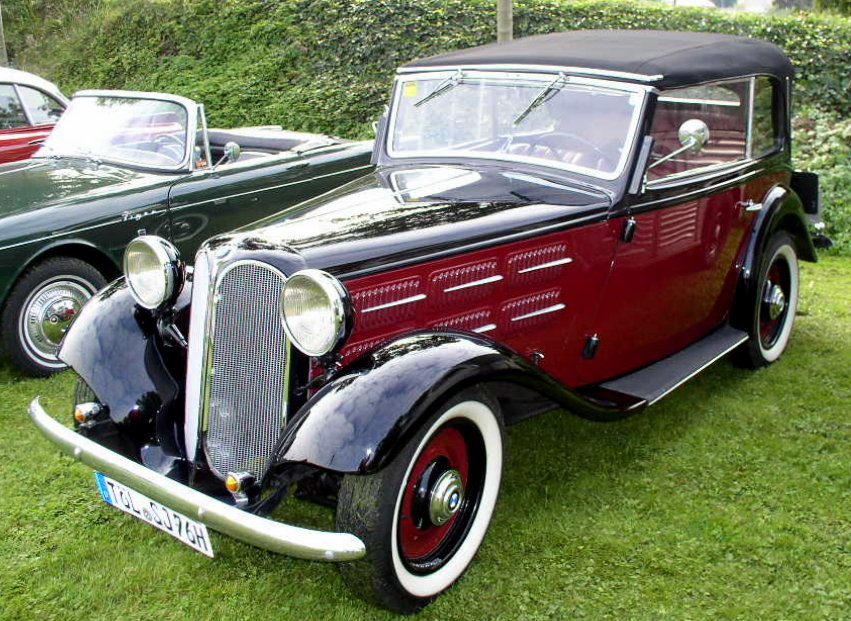
BMW 303 (1932-1934)

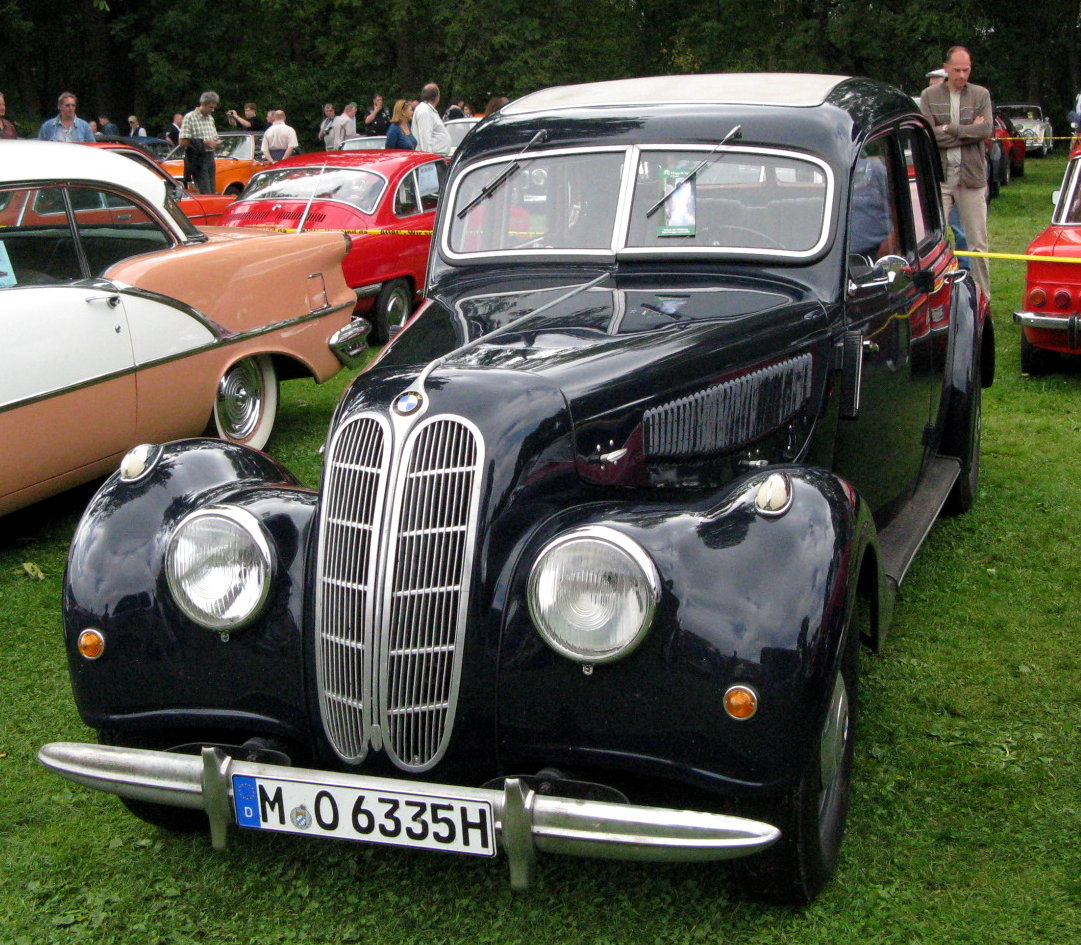
BMW 335 (1939-1941)

=== 1945–1951: Post-war rebuilding ===
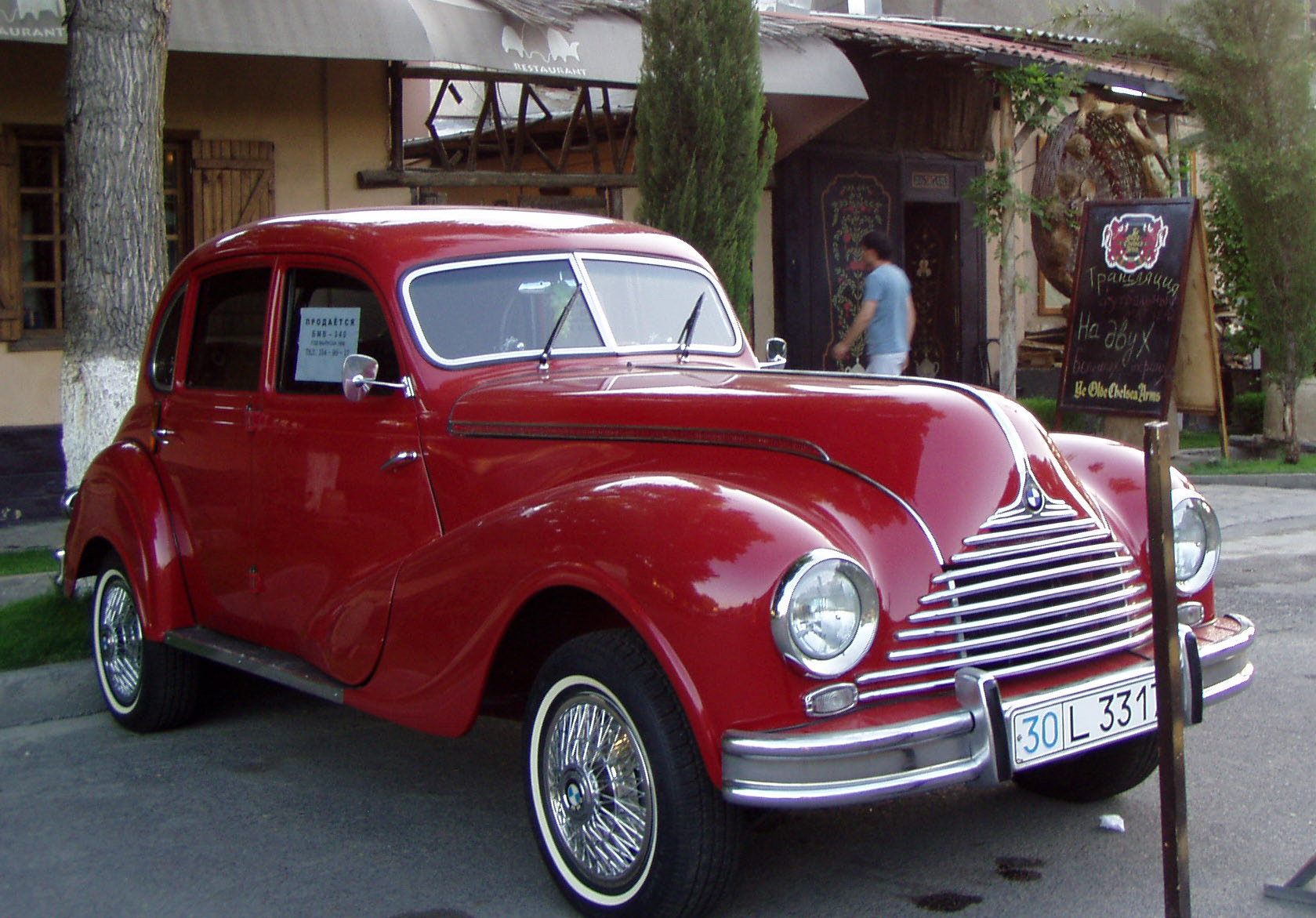
EMW-built BMW 340 (1945-1955)

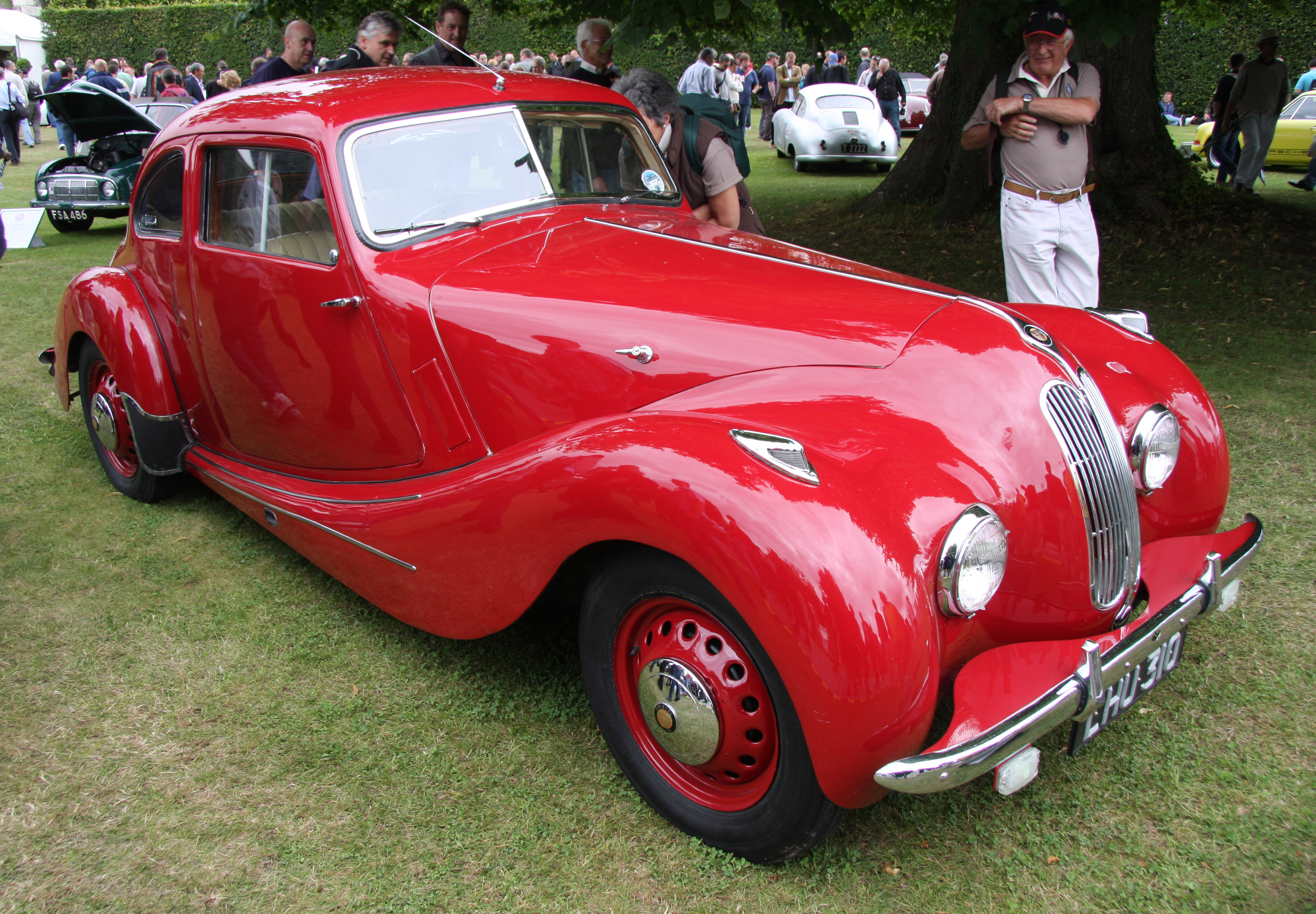
Bristol 400 (1947-1950)

In East Germany, the BMW factories at Eisenach-Dürrerhof, Wandlitz-Basdorf and Zühlsdorf) were seized by the Soviet Union. The factory at Eisenach was taken over by the Soviet Awtowelo Company. and resumed production of the BMW 321 in 1945, just after motorcycle production also resumed. A mildly revised BMW 327 entered production in 1948, followed by the BMW 340 in 1949. These were sold under the BMW name with the BMW logo affixed to them. To protect its trademarks, BMW AG legally severed its Eisenach branch from the company. The Soviet Awtowelo Company continued production of the 327 and 340 under the Eisenacher Motorenwerk (EMW) brand with a red and white version of the logo until 1955.

In West Germany, many of the BMW factories had been heavily bombed during the war. By the end of the war, the Munich plant was completely destroyed. BMW was banned by the Allies from producing motorcycles or automobiles. During this ban, BMW used basic secondhand and salvaged equipment to make pots and pans, later expanding to other kitchen supplies and bicycles.

In 1948, BMW was still barred from producing automobiles, however, the Bristol Aeroplane Company (BAC) inspected the factory, and returned to Britain with plans for the 327 model and the six-cylinder engine as official war reparations. Bristol then employed BMW engineer Fritz Fiedler to lead their engine development team. In 1947, the newly formed Bristol Cars released their 400 coupé, a lengthened version of the BMW 327. that featured BMW's double-kidney grille.

By the end of the 1940s BMW had returned to motorcycle manufacture but still had not restarted automobile manufacture. There were several approaches considered regarding how to re-enter the automotive market. Kurt Donath, technical director of BMW and general manager of the Milbertshofen factory, advocated to produce another manufacturer's old models under licence, also purchasing the tooling to produce the cars from the other manufacturer. Chief engineer Alfred Böning's preferred approach was a small economy car, and he developed the BMW 331 prototype, powered by a 600 cc (37 cu in) motorcycle engine. In the end, it was sales director Hanns Grewenig's proposal that was successful. Grewenig believed that BMW's small production capacity was best suited to luxury cars with high profit margins, similar to the cars BMW made just before the war. To this end, he had Böning and his team design the BMW 501 luxury sedan. The 501 was unveiled in 1951, however delays in receiving and setting up equipment caused production of the 501 to be delayed until late 1952.

=== 1952–1958: Production resumes in Munich ===
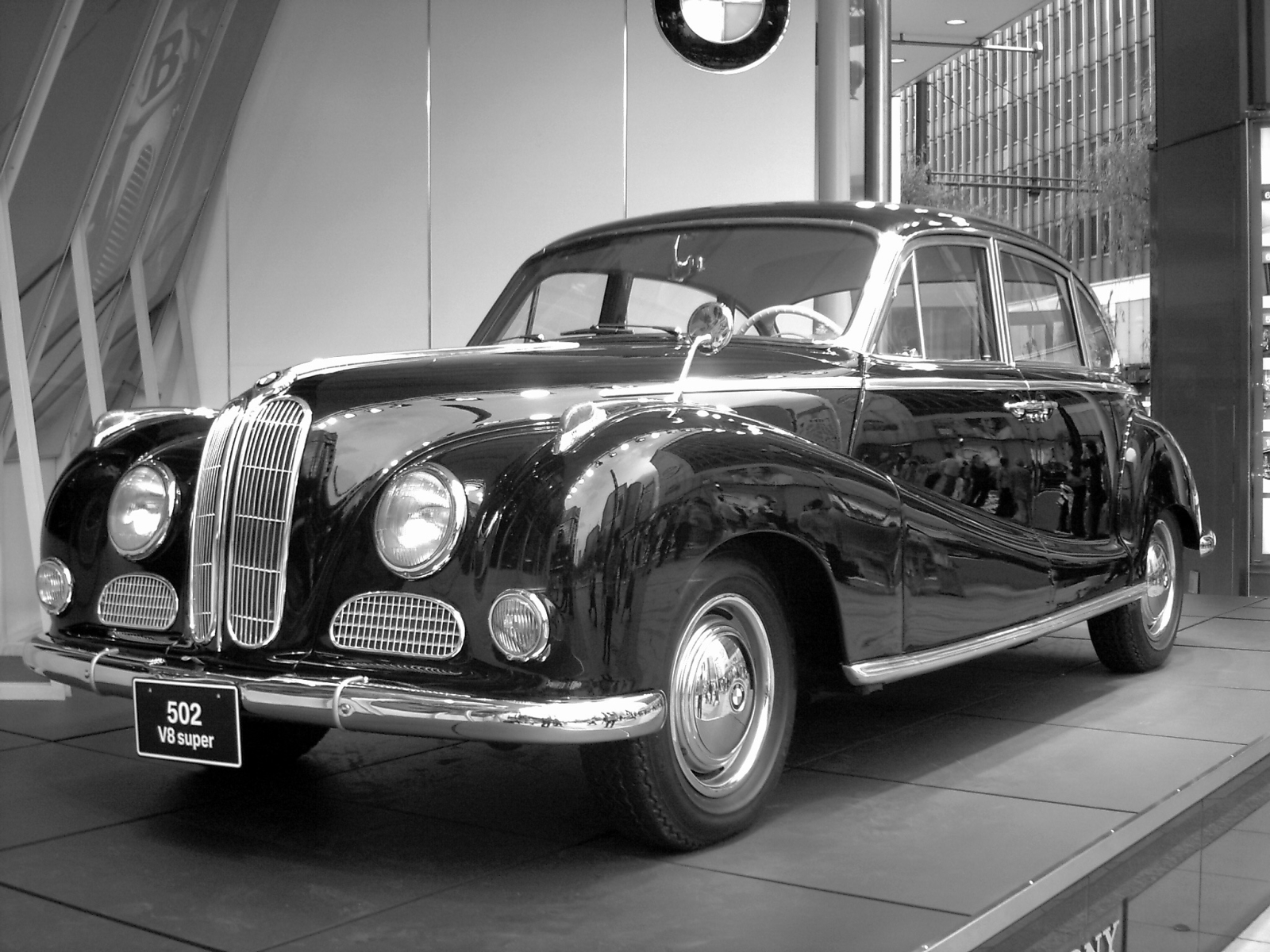
BMW 502 (1954-1964)

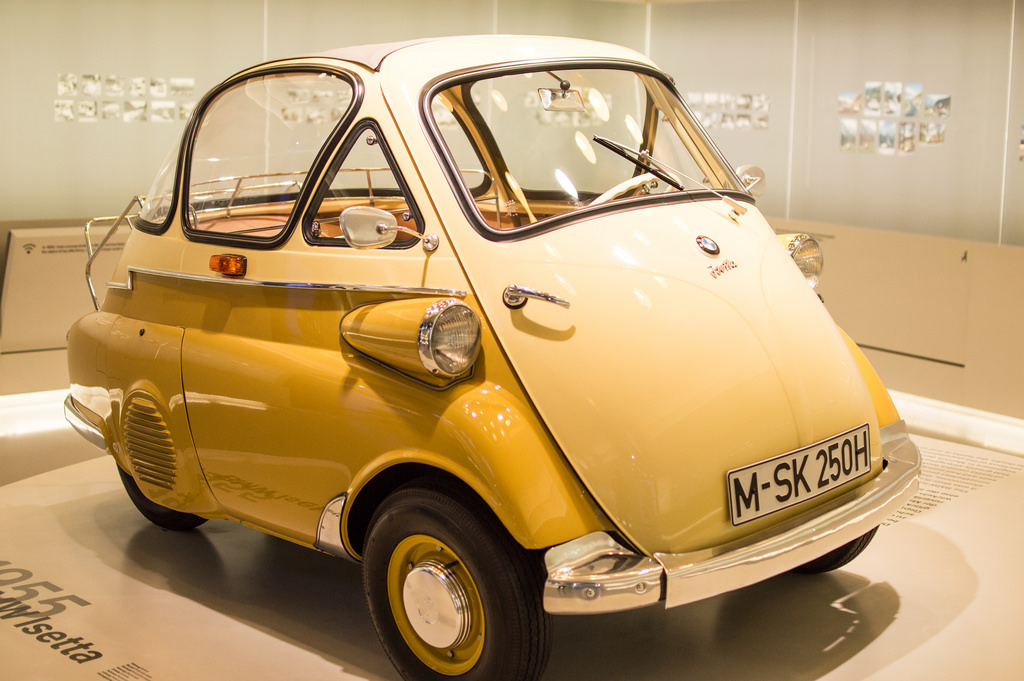
BMW Isetta (1955-1962)

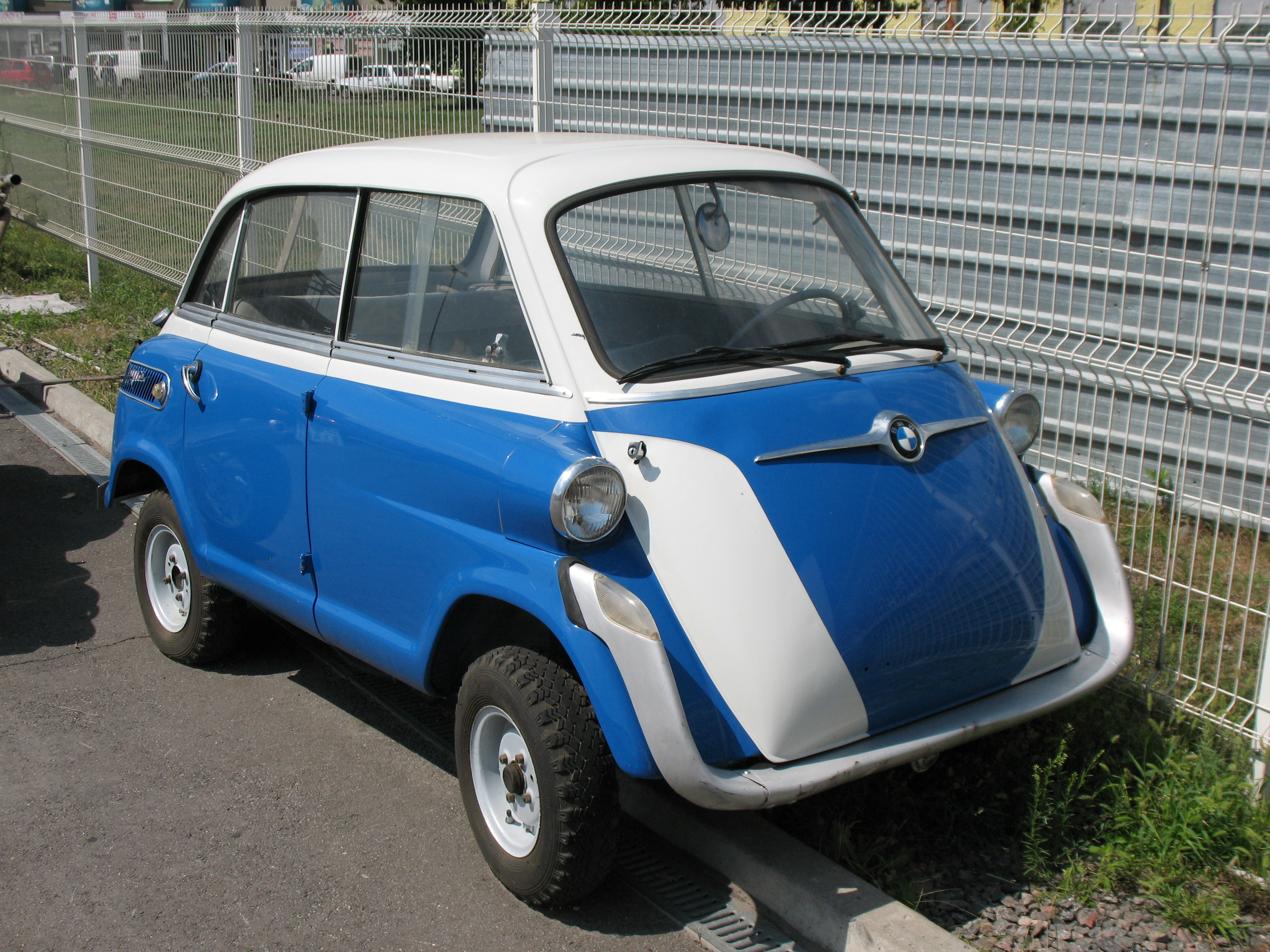
BMW 600 (1957-1959)

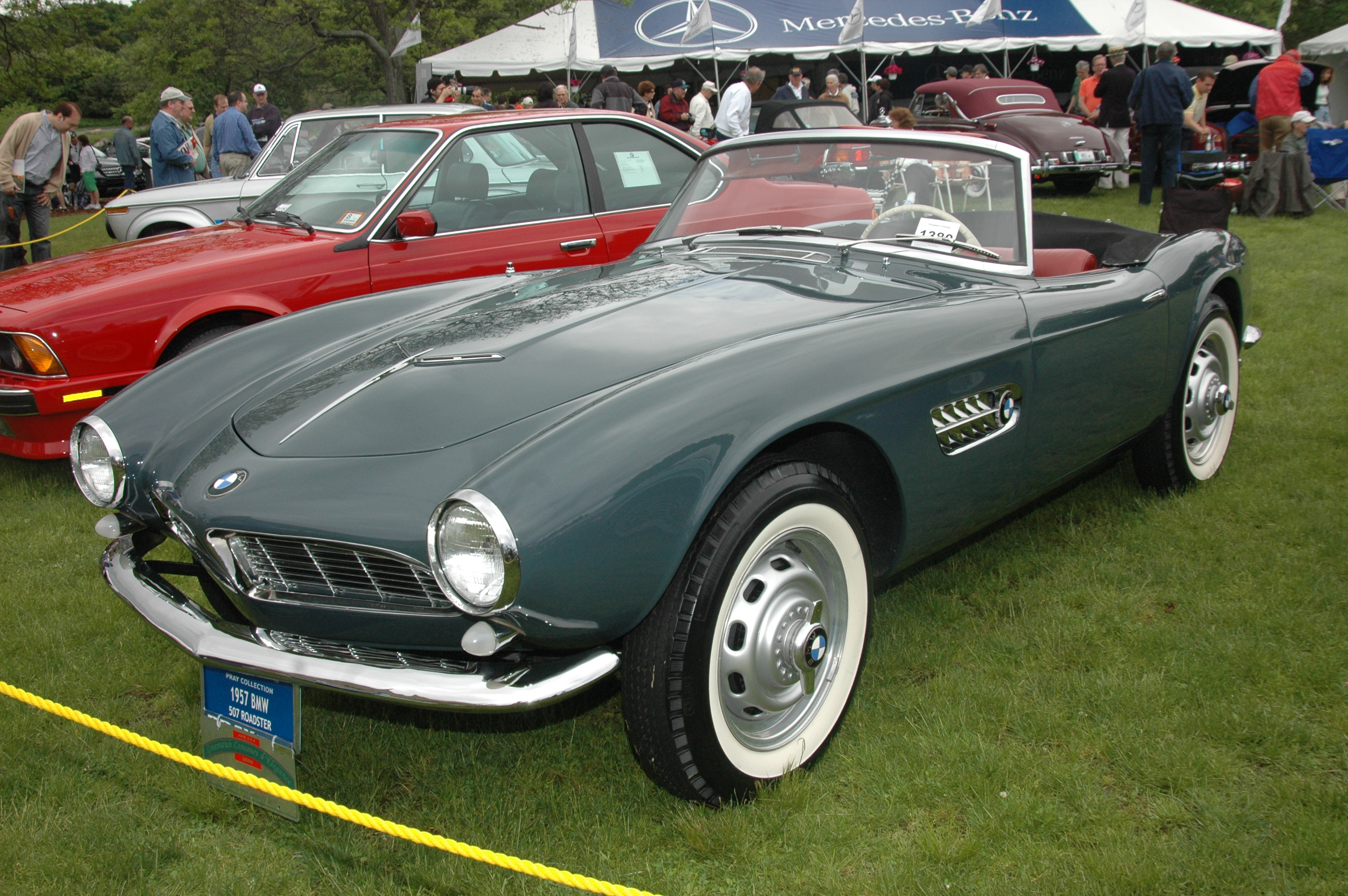
BMW 507 (1956-1959)

There were several other shortcomings with the 501 luxury sedan. The cost was approximately DM15,000— about four times the average German's earnings. It was also much heavier than expected, so the 2.0 L (120 cu in) six-cylinder engine (based on a pre-war design) struggled to provide adequate performance. Construction of the 501 bodies was originally expected to be done in-house, however BMW ended up using bodies built by Karosserie Baur in Stuttgart for more than a year.

In 1954, the 501 model range received some much-needed changes, which resulted in a doubling of sales. The 501 became the 501A and received a price reduction of DM1,000. An entry-level 501B model was introduced, priced at DM1,000 below the 501A. Both models received an upgraded version of the six-cylinder engine. A new BMW 502 flagship model was introduced, with a higher trim level and the new 2.6 L (160 cu in) BMW OHV V8 engine, BMW's first V8 engine.

At the same time, BMW sought to offer a more affordable car. Motorcycles were BMW's largest money earner at the time, and their sales had peaked in 1954. Germans were turning away from mopeds and motorcycles toward light automobiles such as the Messerschmitt KR175 and the Goggomobil. After seeing the Iso Isetta bubble car at the 1954 Geneva Motor Show, BMW entered talks with Iso Rivolta and bought both a licence to manufacture the Isetta and all the tooling needed to manufacture its body. Production of BMW's version of the Isetta began in 1955; more than ten thousand Isettas were sold that year. BMW made more than a hundred thousand Isettas by the end of 1958, and a total of 161,728 by the end of production in 1962.

The Isetta chassis was lengthened to create the BMW 600, since BMW knew that it needed a larger four-seat family car to keep up with the rising wealth and expectations of the German people, but could not afford to develop a new model from scratch. The rear-mounted engine was increased in size from 300 to 600 cc (18 to 37 cu in) and the 600's rear suspension was BMW's first use of the semi-trailing arm system that would be used on their sedans and coupes until the 1990s. Released in 1957, the 600 could not compete against the larger, more powerful Volkswagen Beetle. Production ended in 1959 after fewer than 35,000 were built.

Influenced by the public response to the introduction of the Mercedes-Benz 300SL and Mercedes-Benz 190SL in 1954, BMW began development of a sports car based on the platform of the BMW 502 luxury sedan. The styling was contracted out to industrial designer Albrecht von Goertz, who designed a two-seat roadster and a four-seat grand tourer versions. The BMW 507 roadster was introduced at the Waldorf-Astoria Hotel in New York in early 1955, while the BMW 503 four-seater was introduced a few months later. However, high prices would be the downfall of both models. Max Hoffman, the BMW importer for the United States, told BMW that he would order 2000 507s if he could sell them for US$5,000 each. When the selling price was given as about twice that, and higher than the 300SL, he withdrew his offer. 412 units of the 503 and 253 of the 507 were built during their production runs from 1956 (May for the 503, November for the 507) to March 1959.

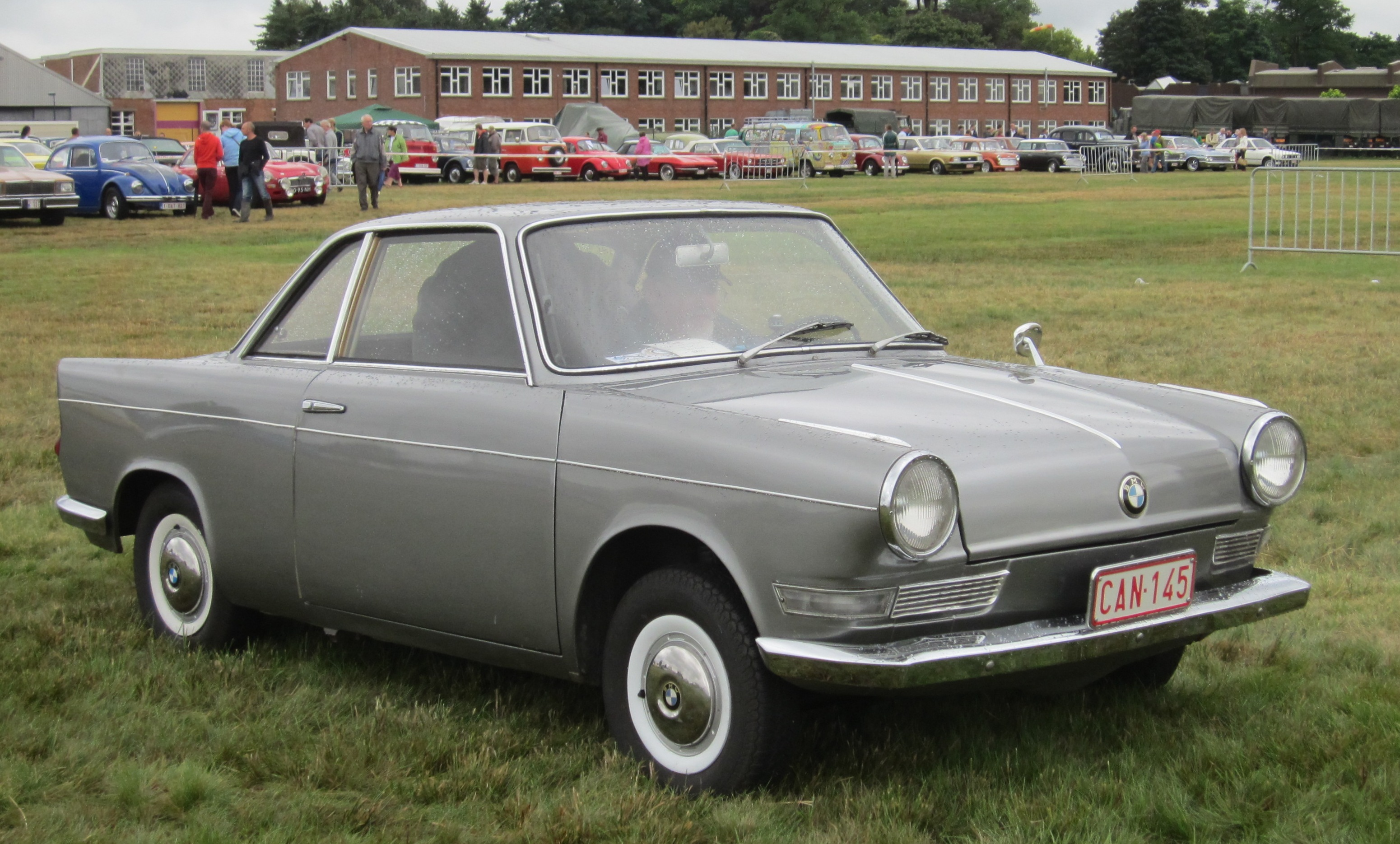
BMW 700 (1959-1965)

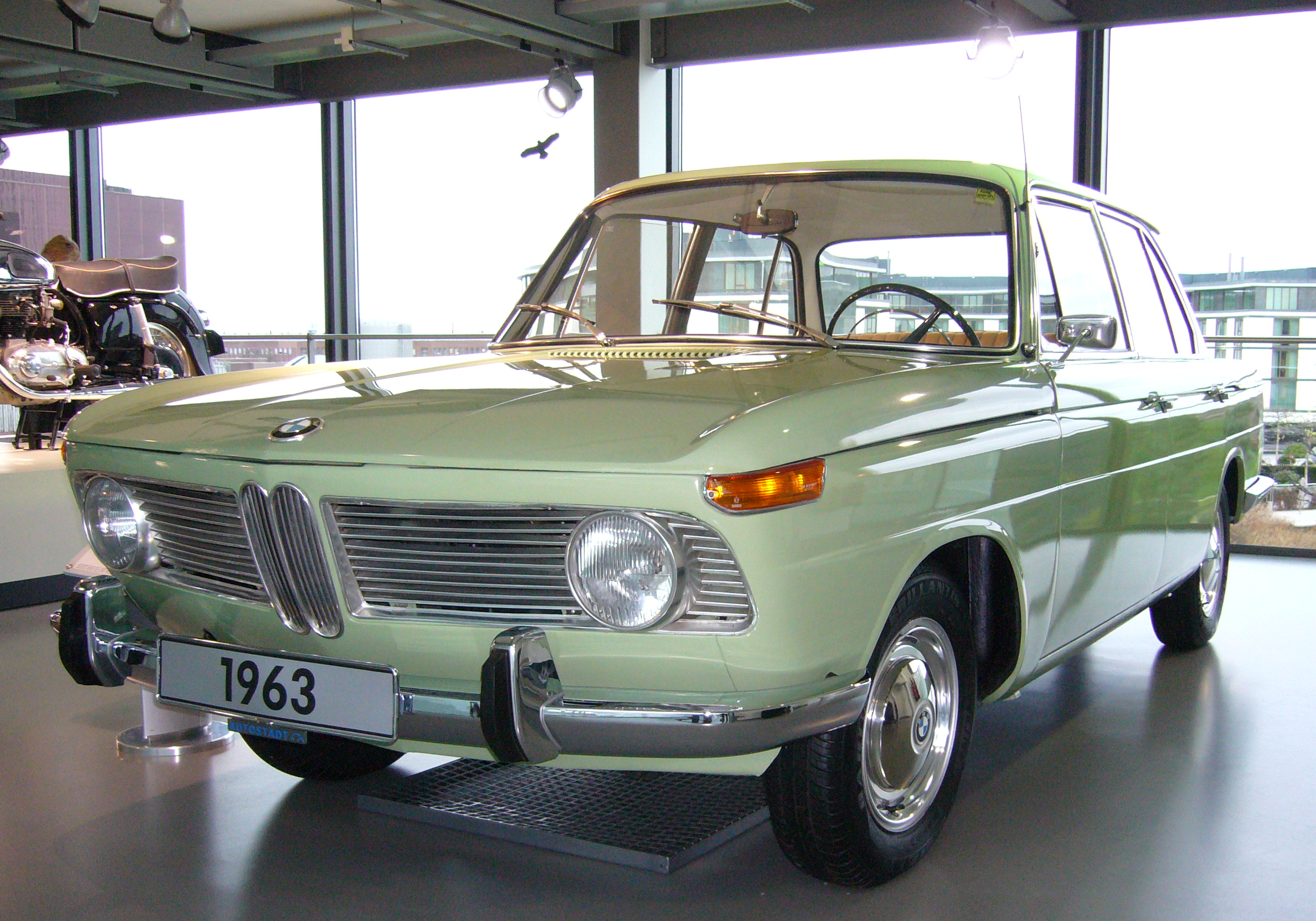
BMW New Class (1962-1972)

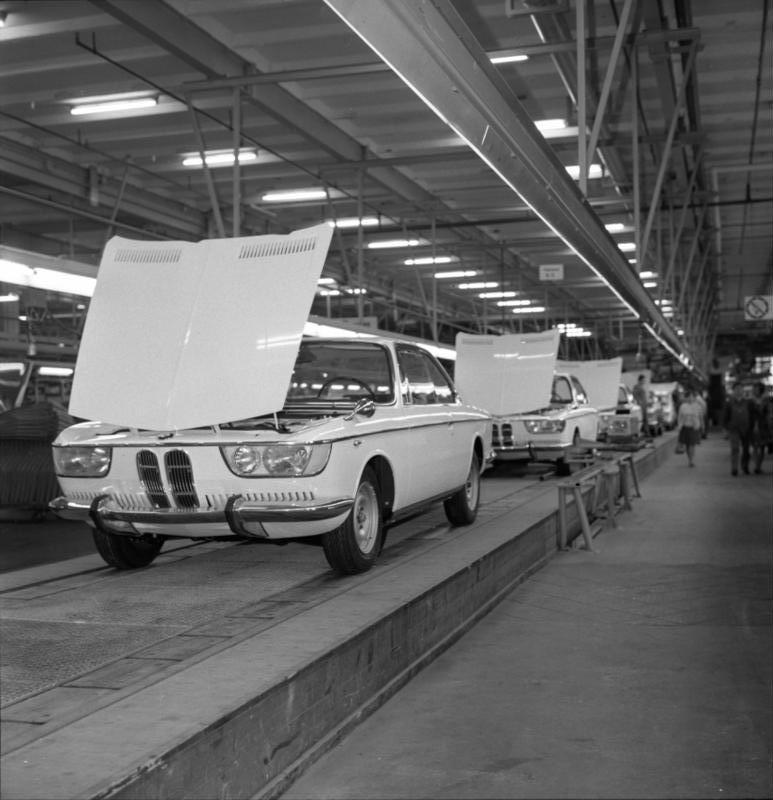
Munich BMW factory in 1968

By 1959, BMW was in debt and losing money. The Isetta was selling well but with small profit margins. Their 501-based luxury sedans were not selling well enough to be profitable and were becoming increasingly outdated. Their 503 coupé and 507 roadster were too expensive to be profitable. The BMW 600, a four-seater based on the Isetta, was selling poorly. The motorcycle market imploded in the mid-1950s with increasing affluence turning Germans away from motorcycles and toward cars. BMW had sold their Allach plant to MAN in 1954. American Motors and the Rootes Group had both tried to acquire BMW.

At BMW's annual general meeting on 9 December 1959, Dr. Hans Feith, chairman of BMW's supervisory board, proposed a merger with Daimler-Benz. The dealers and small shareholders opposed this suggestion and rallied around a counter-proposal by Dr. Friedrich Mathern, which gained enough support to stop the merger. At that time, the Quandt Group, led by half-brothers Herbert and Harald Quandt, had recently increased their holdings in BMW and had become their largest shareholder. By the end of November 1960, the Quandts owned two-thirds of BMW's stock between them.

By this time, BMW had launched the BMW 700, a small car with a rear-mounted 697 cc (43 cu in) engine (based on the BMW R67 motorbike engine). The 700 was available as a 2-door sedan, a coupe and a "RS" model for racing.

In 1960, the development program began for a new range of models, called the "Neue Klasse" (New Class) project. The resulting BMW New Class four-door sedans, introduced in 1962, are credited for saving the company financially and establishing BMW's identity as a producer of sports sedans. The New Class had front disc brakes and four-wheel independent suspension, which helped establish BMW's reputation for sporting cars. It was the first BMW to officially feature the "Hofmeister kink", the rear window line that has been a styling feature of most BMWs since. By 1963, with the company back on its feet, BMW offered dividends to its shareholders for the first time since World War II.

In 1965, the New Class range was expanded with the New Class Coupés luxury models. The following year, the two-door version of the 1600 was launched, along with a convertible in 1967. These models began the BMW 02 Series, of which the 2002 sports sedan model was the best known.

BMW acquired the Hans Glas company based in Dingolfing, Germany, in 1966. Glas vehicles were briefly badged as BMW until the company was fully absorbed. It was reputed that the acquisition was mainly to gain access to Glas’ development of the timing belt with an overhead camshaft in automotive applications, although some saw Glas’ Dingolfing plant as another incentive. However, this factory was outmoded and BMW's biggest immediate gain was, according to themselves, a stock of highly qualified engineers and other personnel. The Glas factories continued to build a limited number of their existing models, while adding the manufacture of BMW front and rear axles until they could be closer incorporated into BMW.

=== 1968–1978: New Six, 3 Series, 5 Series, 7 Series ===
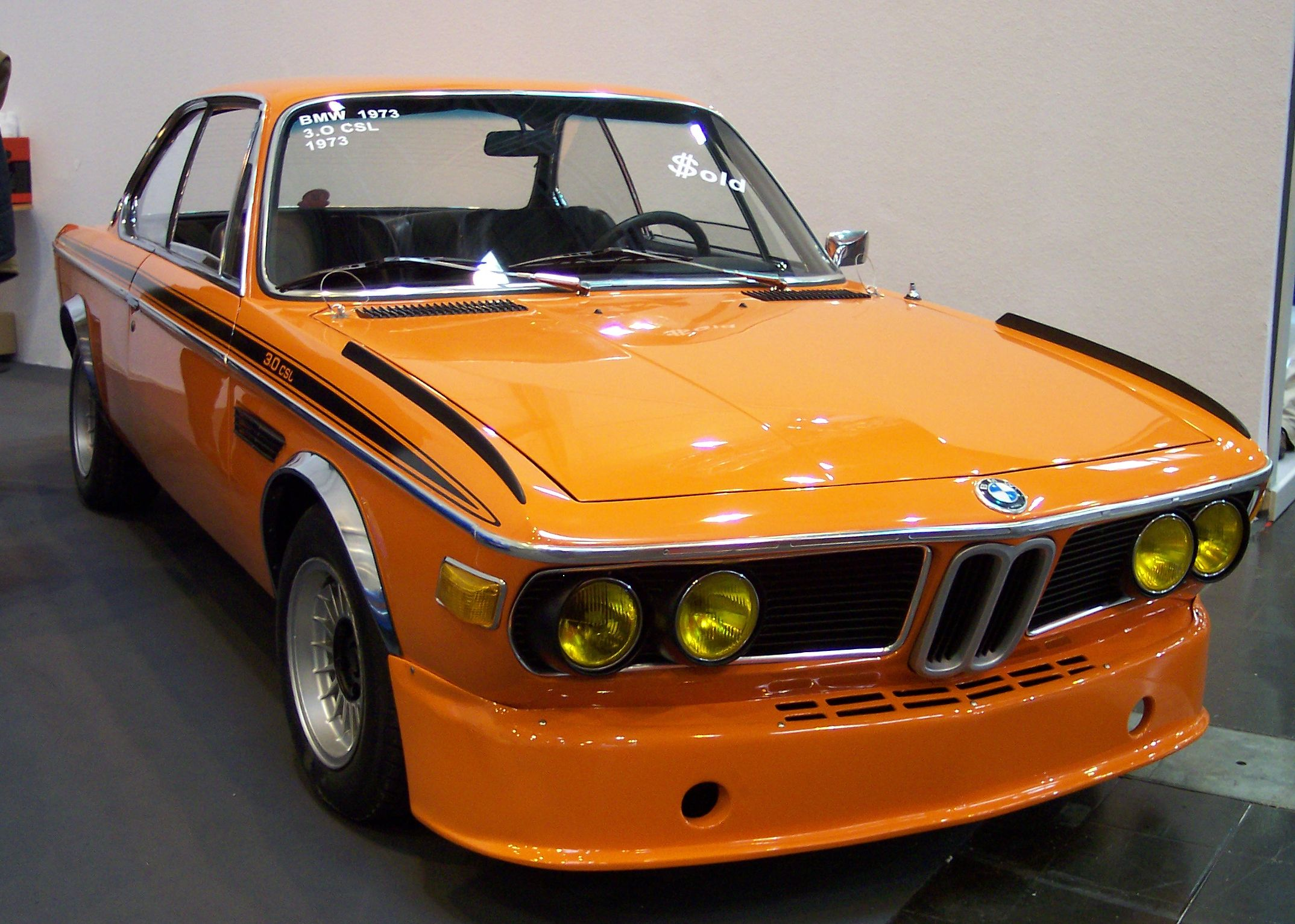
E9 3.0 CSL

In 1968, production of the BMW M30 engine began, BMW's first straight-six engine since World War II which would remain in production for 24 years. This engine coincided with the launch of the New Six large sedans (the predecessor to the 7 Series) and New Six CS large coupes (the predecessor to the 6 Series).

The first generation of the BMW 5 Series mid-size sedans were introduced in 1972, to replace the New Class sedans. The 5 Series platform was also used for the BMW 6 Series coupes, which were introduced in 1976. In 1975, the first generation of the BMW 3 Series range of compact sedans/coupes was introduced as the replacement for the 02 Series. The first generation of the BMW 7 Series large sedans were introduced in 1978.

=== 1978–1989: M division ===
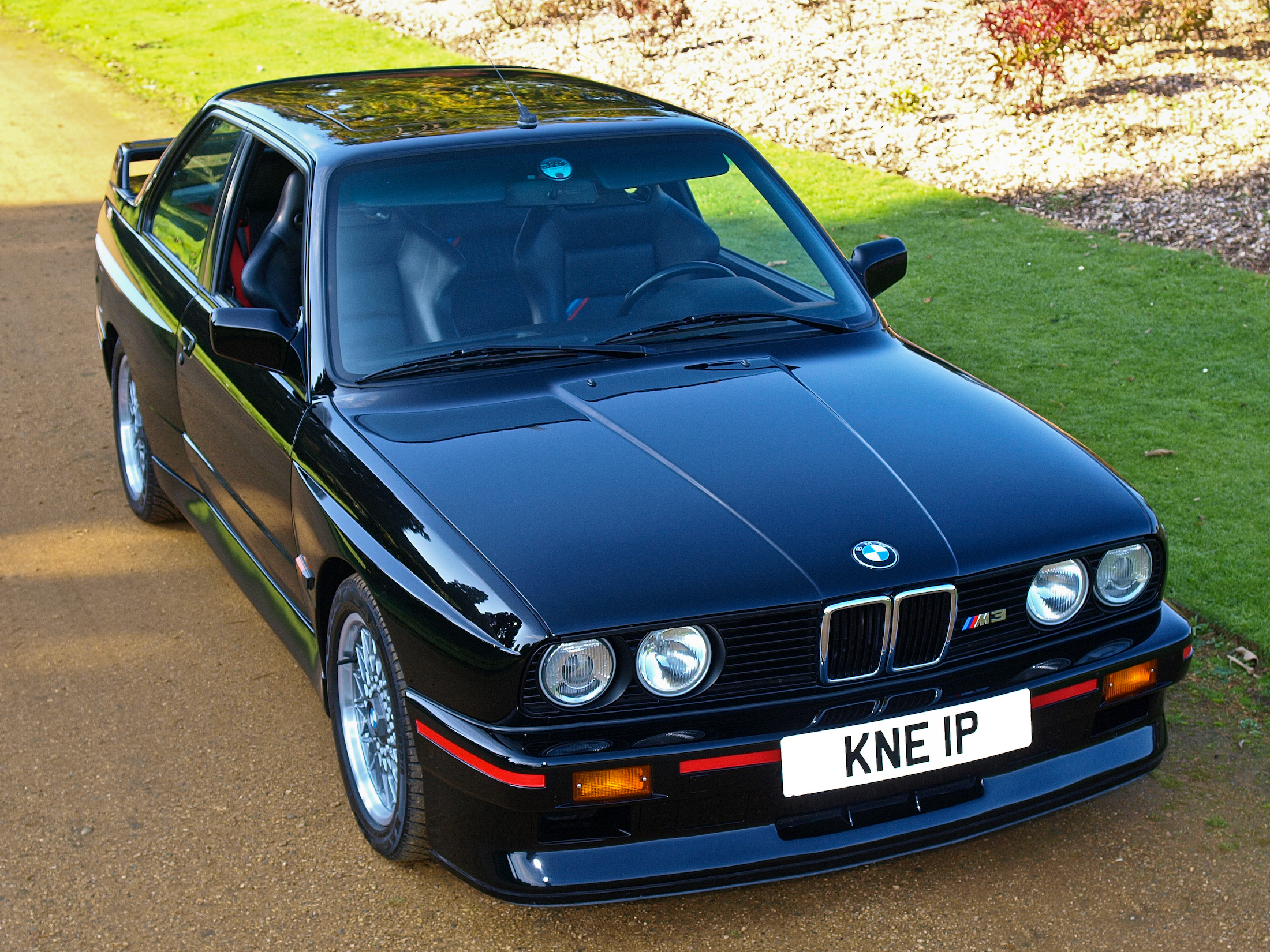
E30 M3

The 1978 BMW M1 was BMW's first mid-engined sports car and was developed in conjunction with Lamborghini. It was also the first road car produced by BMW's motorsport division, BMW M. In 1980, the M division produced its first model based on a regular production vehicle, the E12 5 Series M535i. The M535i is the predecessor to the BMW M5, which was introduced in 1985 based on the E28 5 Series platform.

In 1983, BMW introduced its first diesel engine, the BMW M21. The first all-wheel drive BMW was the E30 3 Series 325iX model, which began production in 1985. The E30 became BMW's first model produced in a station wagon (estate) body style, when the "Touring" model was introduced in 1987.

The 1986 E32 7 Series 750i model was BMW's first car to use a V12 engine. The E32 was also the first sedan to be available with a long-wheelbase body style (badged "iL" or "Li").

The BMW M3 was introduced in 1985, as part of the E30 3 Series model range.

=== 1989–1994: 8 Series, hatchbacks ===
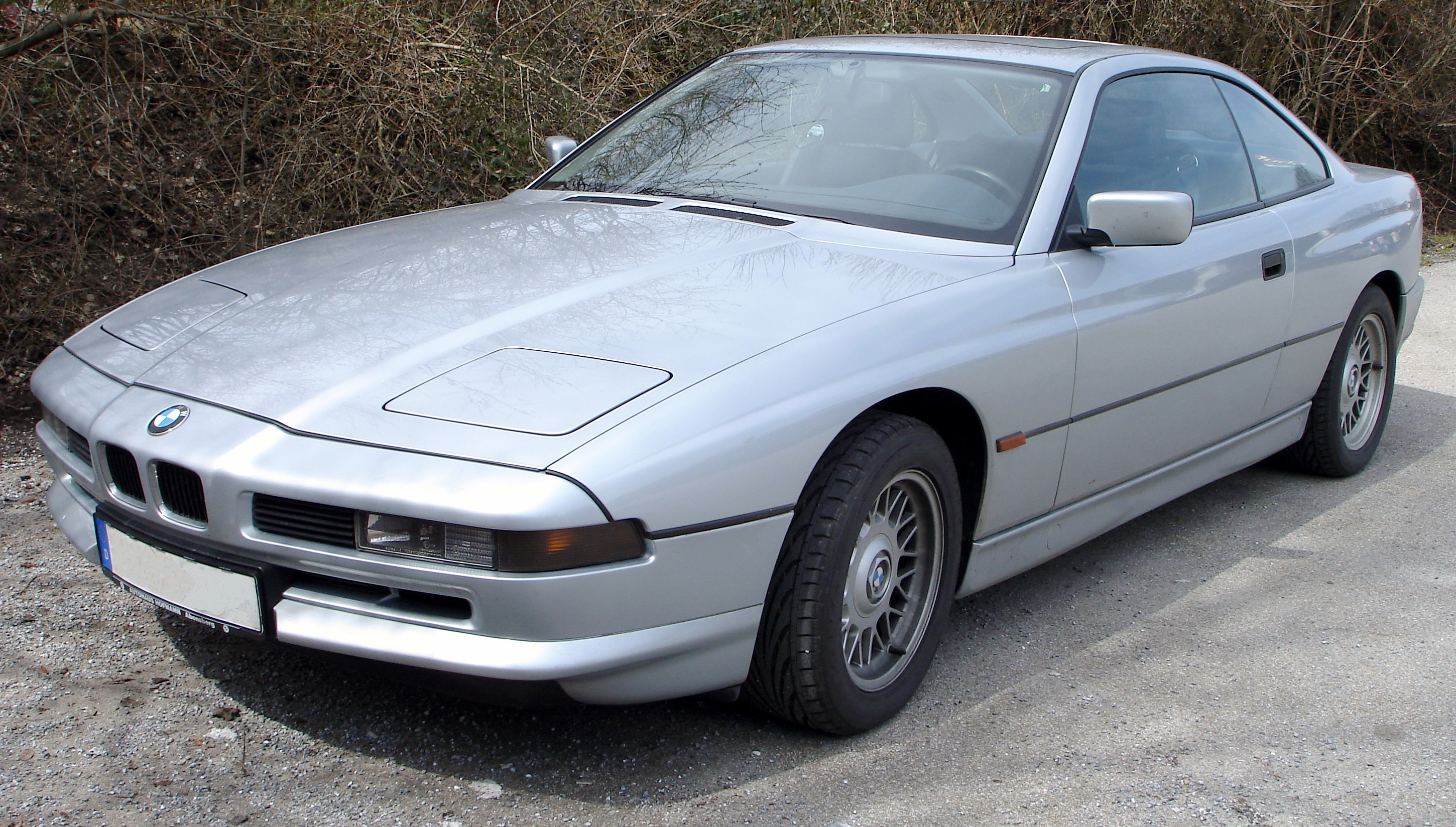
E31 8 Series

The 8 Series range of large coupes was introduced in 1989 and in 1992 was the first application of BMW's first V8 engine in 25 years, the BMW M60. It was also the first BMW to use a multi-link rear suspension, a design which was implemented for mass-production in 1990 E36 3 Series.

The E34 5 Series, introduced in 1988, was the first 5 Series to be produced with all-wheel drive or a wagon body style.

In 1989, the limited-production BMW Z1 began BMW's line of two-seat convertible Z Series models.

In 1993, the BMW 3 Series Compact (built on the E36 3 Series platform) was BMW's first hatchback model (except for the limited production 02 Series "Touring" models). These hatchback models formed a new entry-level model range below the other 3 Series models.

In 1992, BMW acquired a large stake in California-based industrial design studio DesignworksUSA, which they fully acquired in 1995. Their first automotive assembly plant outside of Germany was announced to be built in Greer, South Carolina (between Greenville and Spartanburg) in the United States. It was assembling cars a year later.

The 1993 McLaren F1 is powered by a BMW V12 engine.

=== 1994–1999: Rover ownership, Z3 ===
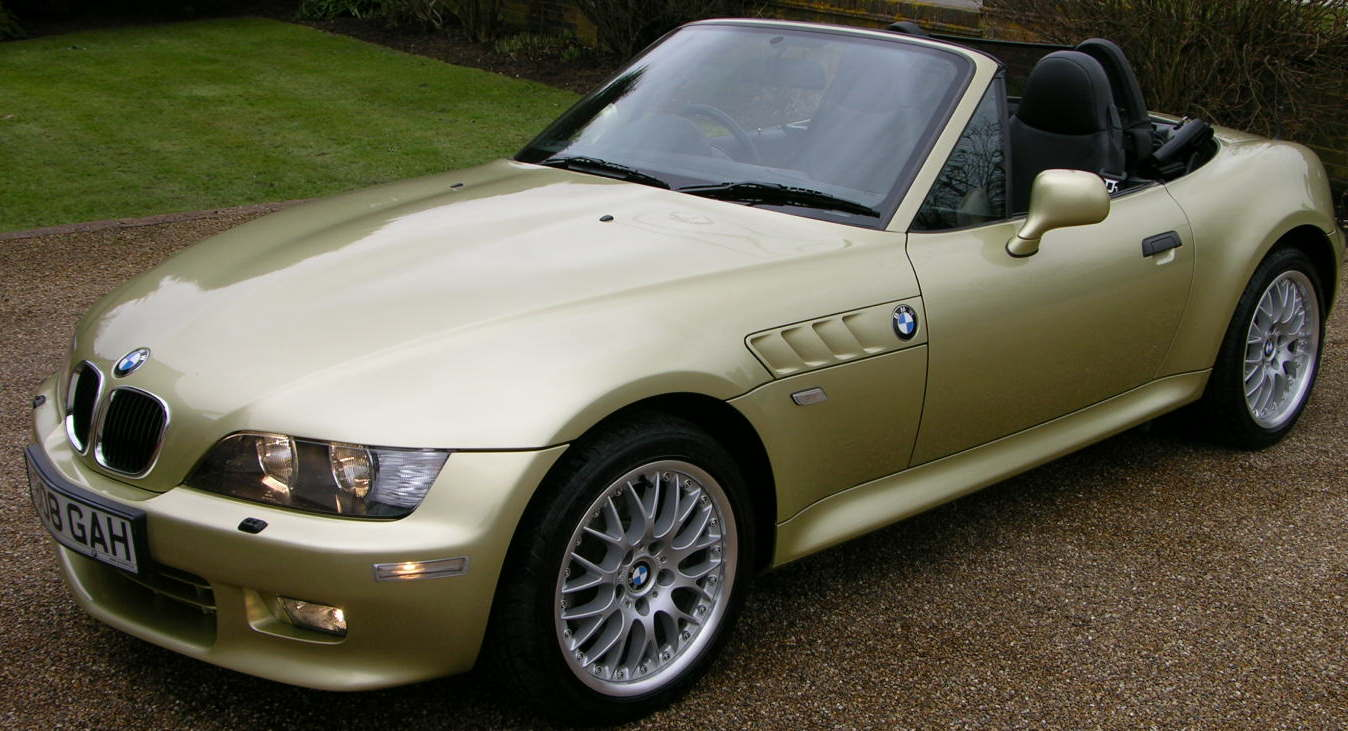
BMW Z3 (1995-2002)

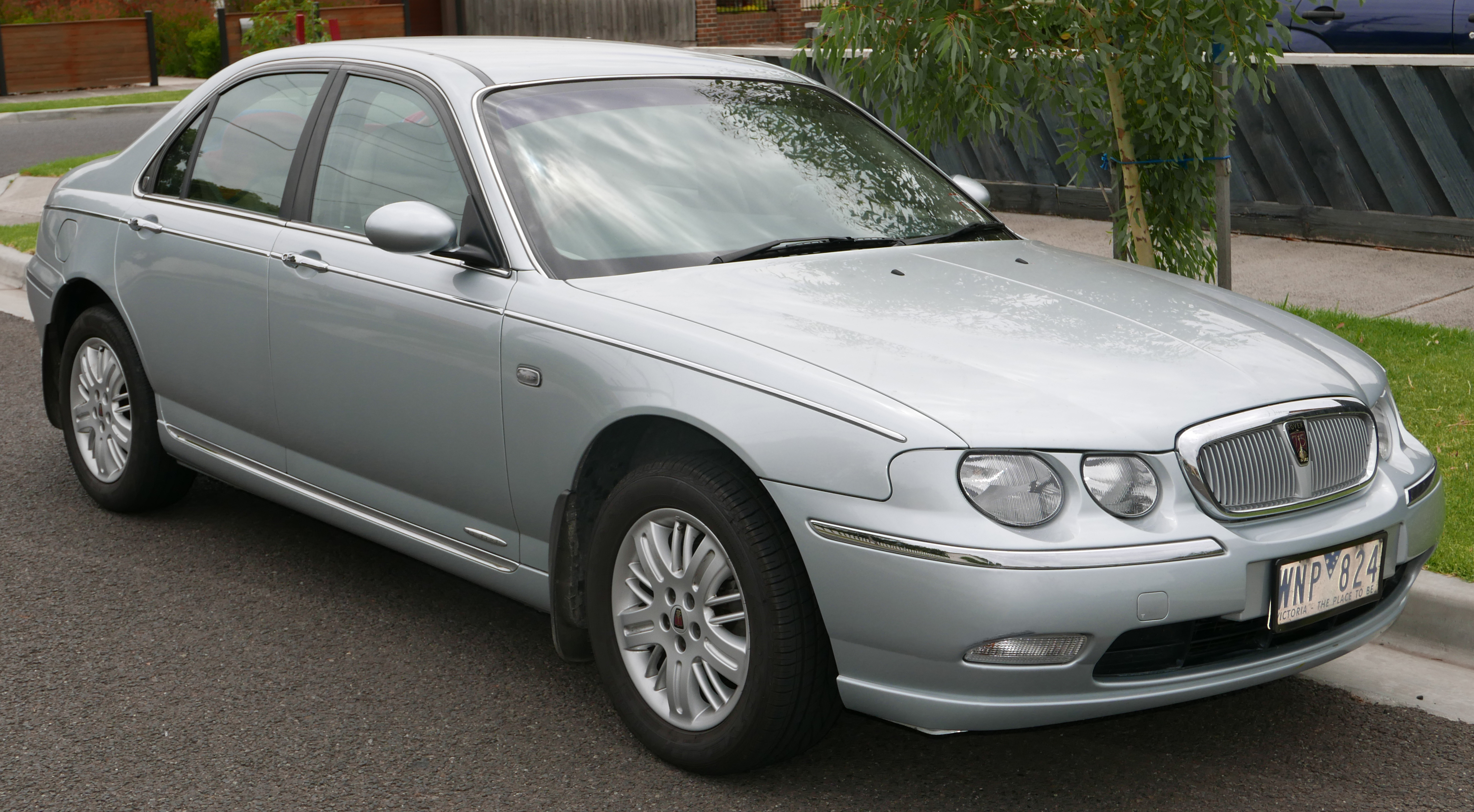
Rover 75 (1998-2005)

In 1994, BMW bought the British Rover Group (which at the time consisted of the Rover, Land Rover, Mini and MG brands as well as the rights to defunct Austin and Morris brands), and owned it for six years.

The purchase of Rover was not successful. Already struggling after years of industrial disputes, Rover had a poor reputation but in trying to improve its image it would become a rival to the BMW market segment. BMW found it difficult to reposition the English automaker alongside its own products and the Rover division was faced with endless changes in its marketing strategy. In the six years under BMW, Rover was positioned as a premium automaker, a mass-market automaker, a division of BMW and an independent unit. The 1996 documentary, When Rover Met BMW gave some insight into the difficulties faced by the two companies.

By 2000, Rover was incurring huge losses and BMW decided to sell off several of the brands. The MG and Rover brands were sold to the Phoenix Consortium to form MG Rover, while Land Rover was taken over by Ford. BMW, meanwhile, retained the rights to Mini (the all new Mini was launched in 2001).

Back in Germany, the 1995 E38 7 Series 725tds was the first 7 Series to use a diesel engine. The E39 5 Series was also introduced in 1995 and was the first 5 Series to use rack-and-pinion steering and a significant number of suspension parts made from lightweight aluminum.

The Z3 two-seat convertible and coupe models were introduced in 1995. These were the first mass-produced models outside of the 1/3/5 Series and the first model to be solely manufactured outside Germany (in the United States, in this case).

In 1998, the E46 3 Series was introduced, with the M3 model featuring BMW's most powerful naturally aspirated engine to date.

=== 1999–2006: SUV models, Rolls-Royce ===
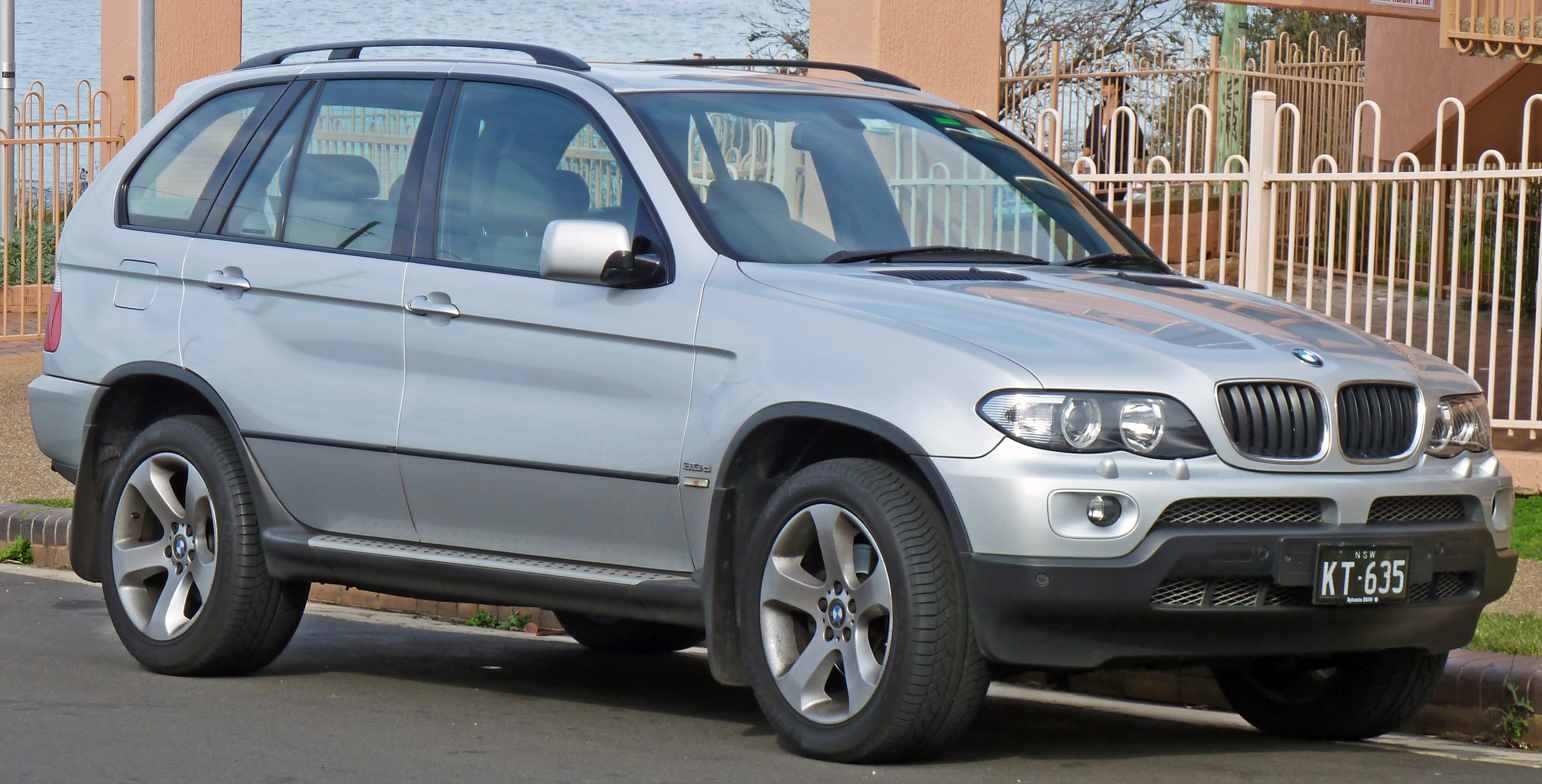
E53 X5 (1999-2006)

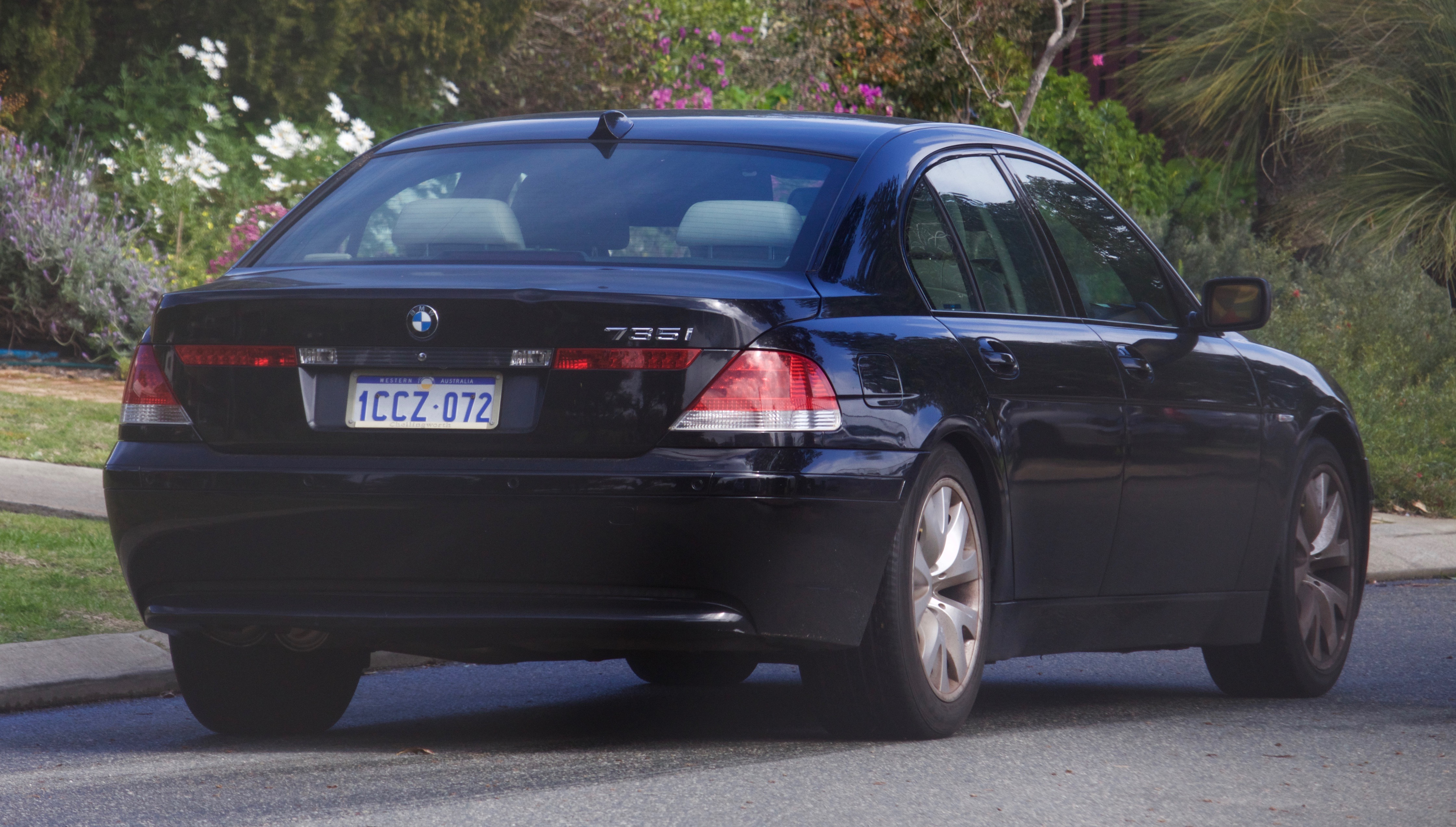
E65 7 Series (2001-2008) with controversial rear-end styling

BMW's first SUV, the X5, was introduced in 1999. The X5 was a large departure from BMW's image of sporting "driver’s cars", however, it was very successful and resulted in other SUVs being introduced, such as the smaller X3 in 2003.

The 2001 E65 7 Series was BMW's first model to use a 6-speed automatic transmission and the iDrive infotainment system. The E65 also attracted controversy for its exterior styling.

In 2002, the Z4 two-seat coupe/convertible replaced the Z3. In 2004, the 1 Series hatchbacks replaced the 3 Series Compact models as BMW's entry-level models.

2003 Rolls-Royce Phantom was the first Rolls-Royce vehicle produced under BMW ownership. This was the result of complicated contractual negotiations that began in 1998 when Rolls-Royce plc licensed use of the Rolls-Royce name and logo to BMW, but Vickers sold the remaining elements of Rolls-Royce Motor Cars to Volkswagen. In addition, BMW had supplied Rolls-Royce with engines since 1998 for use in the Rolls-Royce Silver Seraph.

In 2005, BMW's first V10 engine was introduced in the M5 model of the E60 5 Series range. The E60 platform was also used for the E63/E64 6 Series, which reintroduced the 6 Series models after a hiatus of 14 years.

=== 2006–2013: Shift to turbocharged engines ===
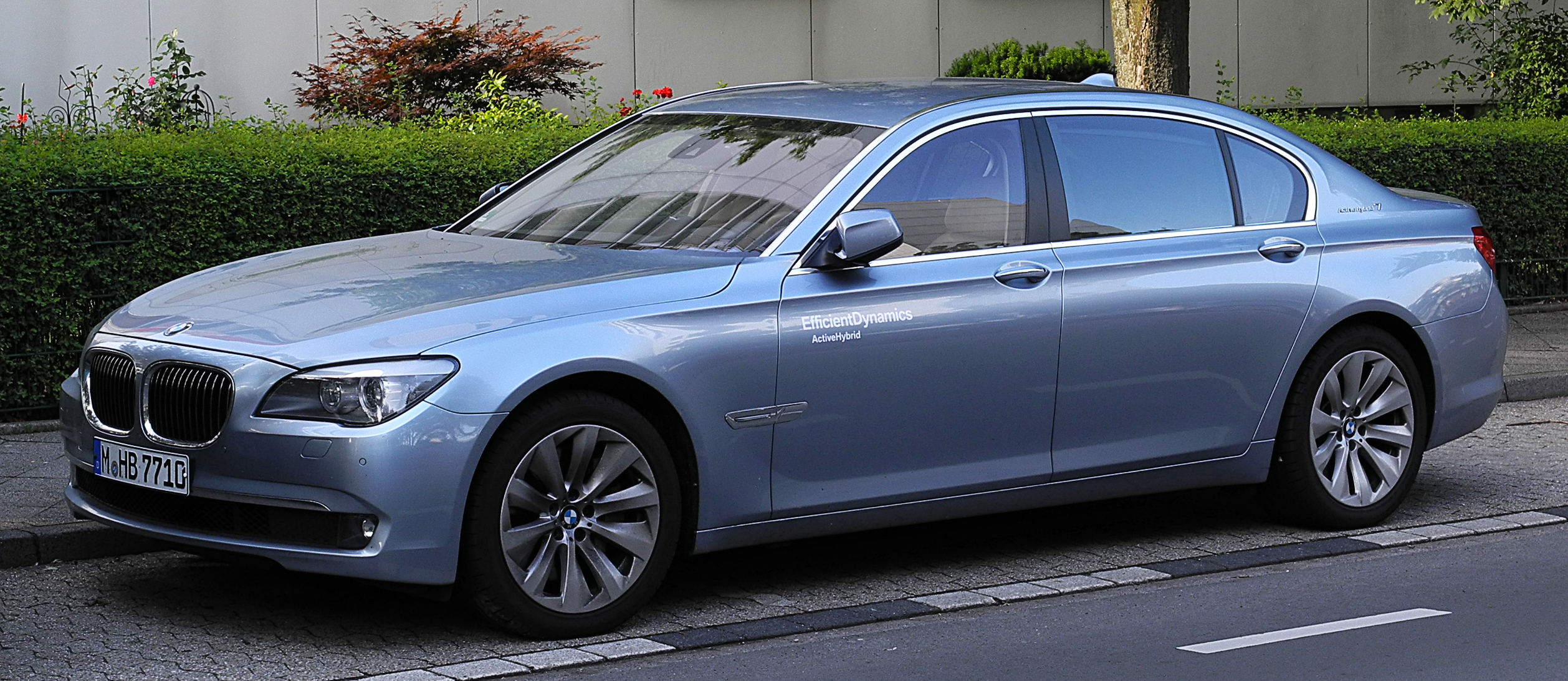
F01 7 Series (2008-2016) ActiveHybrid 7 model

BMW's first mass-production turbocharged petrol engine was the six-cylinder BMW N54, which debuted in the 2006 E92 3 Series 335i model. In 2011, the F30 3 Series was released, with turbocharged engines being used on all models. This shift to turbocharging and smaller engines was reflective of general automotive industry trends. The M3 model based on the F30 platform is the first M3 to use a turbocharged engine.

BMW's first turbocharged V8 engine, the BMW N63, was introduced in 2008. Despite the trend to downsizing, in 2008 BMW began production of its first turbocharged V12 engine, the BMW N74. In 2011, the F10 5 Series was the first time an M5 model used a turbocharged engine.

The BMW X6 SUV was introduced in 2008. The X6 attracted controversy for its unusual combination of coupe and SUV styling cues.

In 2009, the BMW X1 compact SUV was introduced. The BMW 5 Series Gran Turismo fastback body style was also introduced in 2009, based on the 5 Series platform.

BMW's first hybrid-powered car, the E72 X6 ActiveHybrid was introduced in 2009. This was followed by the F04 7 Series ActiveHybrid 7 model the following year.

=== 2013–present: Electric/hybrid/fuel-cell power ===
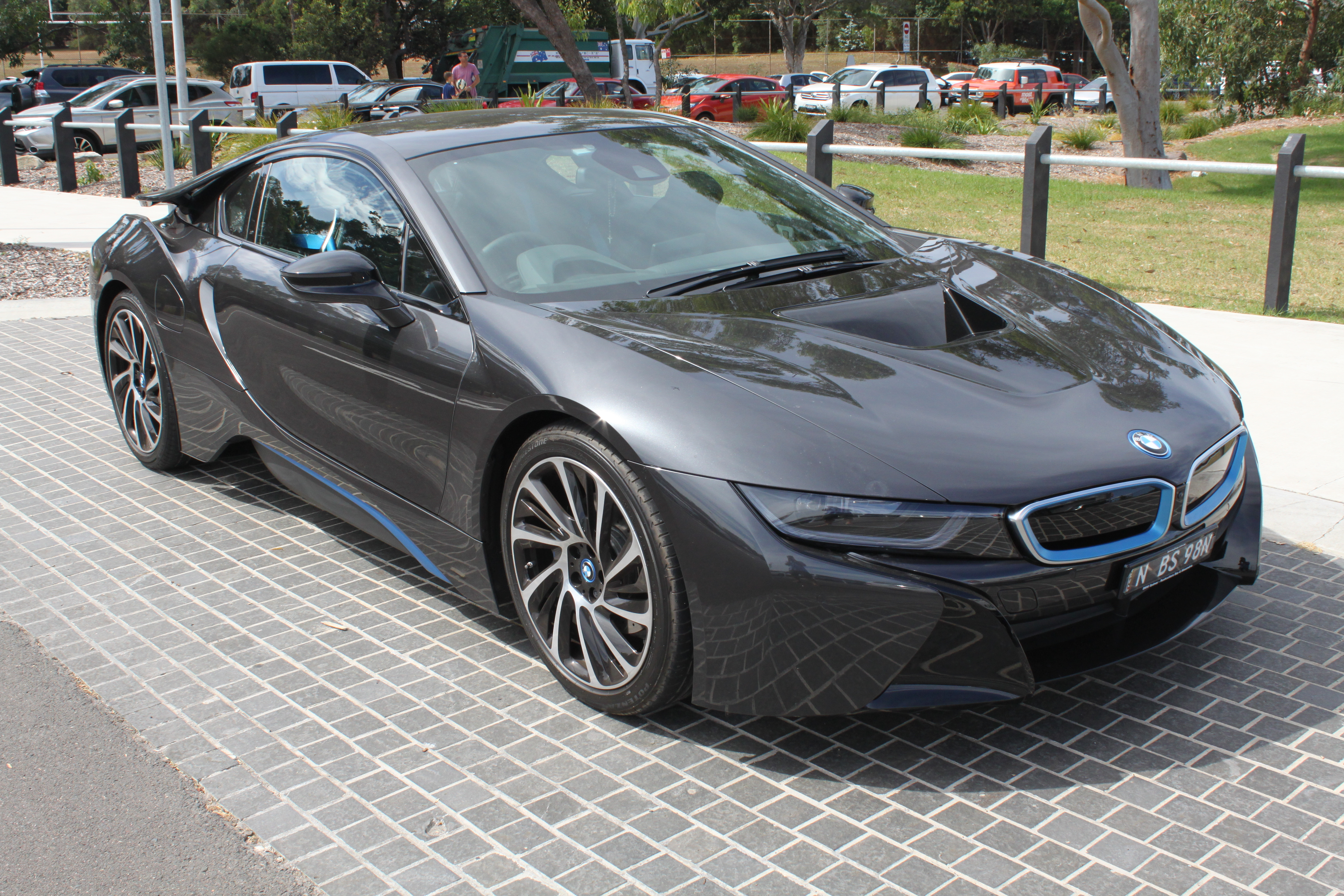
i8 (2014-2020)

BMW released their first electric car, the BMW i3 city car, in 2013. The i3 is also the first mass-production car to have a structure mostly made from carbon-fiber. BMW's first hybrid sportscar (and their first mid-engined car since the M1) is called the BMW i8 and was introduced in 2014. The i8 is also the first car to use BMW's first inline-three engine, the BMW B38.

In 2013, the BMW 4 Series replaced the coupe and convertible models of the 3 Series. Many elements of the 4 Series remained shared with the equivalent 3 Series model. Similarly, the BMW 2 Series replaced the coupe and convertible models of the 1 Series in 2013. The 2 Series was produced in coupe (F22), five-seat MPV (F45) and seven-seat MPV (F46) body styles. The latter two body styles are the first front-wheel drive vehicles produced by BMW. The F48 X1 also includes some front-wheel-drive models.

The BMW X4 compact SUV was introduced in 2014.

The 2016 G11 7 Series 740e and F30 3 Series 330e models are the first plug-in hybrid versions of the 7 Series and 3 Series respectively.

== See also ==
- BMW Group Classic
