= BMW R32 =

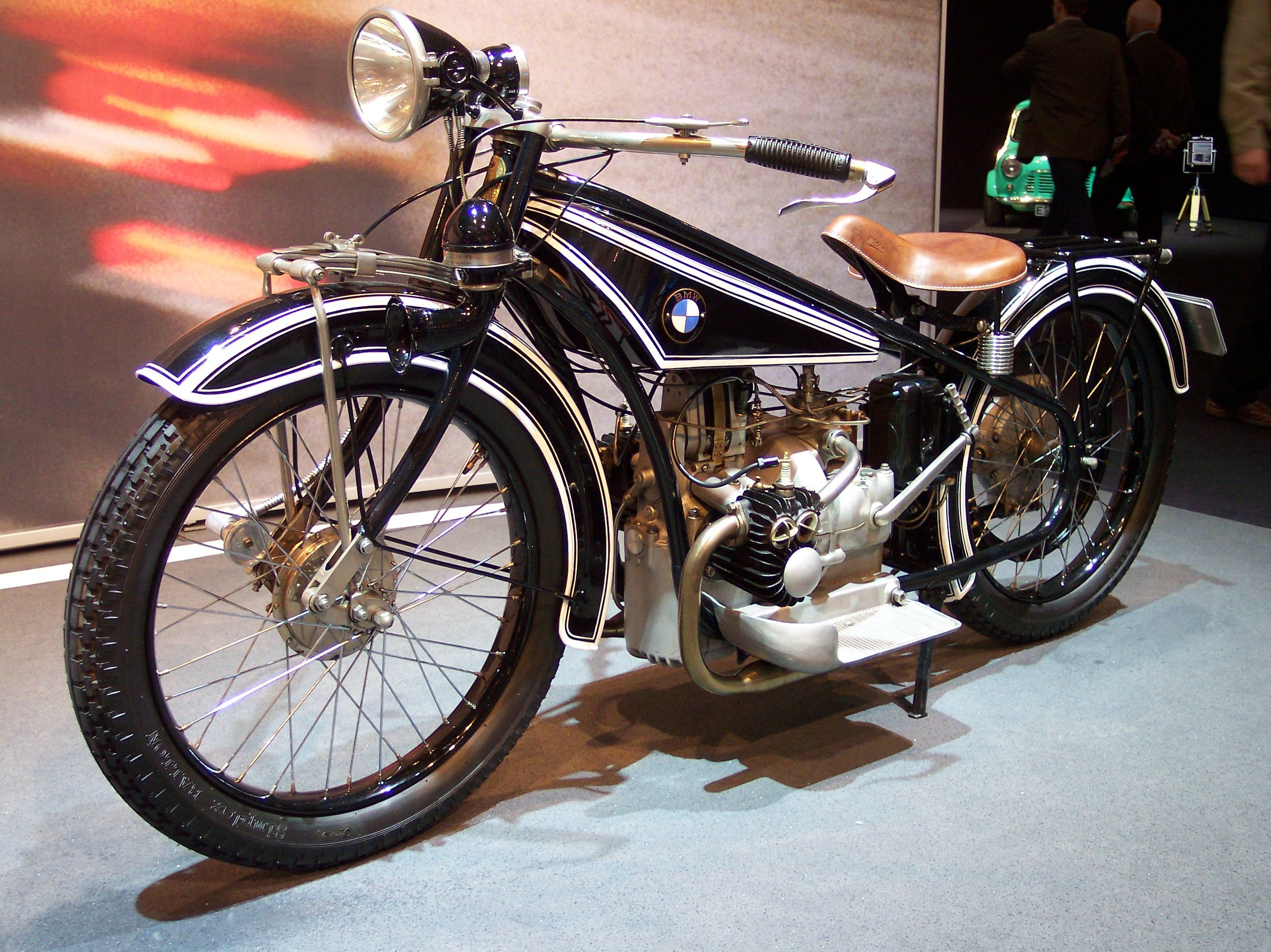
- Manufacturer: BMW AG
- Production: 1923–1926; 3,090 produced
- Predecessor: Helios
- Successor: BMW R42, BMW R47
- Class: standard
- Engine: BMW M2B33 494 cc side-valve air-cooled flat-twin
- Bore / stroke: 68 mm × 68 mm (2.7 in × 2.7 in)
- Top speed: 95 km/h (59 mph)
- Power: 8.5 hp (6.3 kW) @ 3200 rpm
- Transmission: 3 speed manual
- Suspension: Front: Trailing link with twin cantilever spring Rear: none
- Brakes: Front: None (First Series) Later, drum Rear: block
- Tires: 26 x 3 front and rear
- Wheelbase: 1,380 mm (54 in)
- Dimensions: L: 2,100 mm (83 in); W: 800 mm (31 in); H: 950 mm (37 in)
- Weight: 122 kg (269 lb) (wet)
- Fuel capacity: 14 litres, 3.07 imperial gallon 3.69 US gallon
- Fuel consumption: approximately 3 litres per 100 kilometres (94 mpg_{‑imp}; 78 mpg_{‑US})

The BMW R32 was the first motorcycle produced by BMW under the BMW name. An aircraft engine manufacturer during World War I, BMW was forced to diversify after the Treaty of Versailles banned the German air force and German aircraft manufacture. BMW initially turned to industrial engine design and manufacturing.

== History ==
In 1919, BMW designed and manufactured the flat-twin M2B15 engine for Victoria Werke AG of Nuremberg. The engine was initially intended as a portable industrial engine, but found its main use in Victoria motorcycles. The engine was also used in the Helios motorcycle built by Bayerische Flugzeugwerke, which was later merged into BMW AG. Bayerische Flugzeugwerke also manufactured a small two-stroke engined motorcycle, called the Flink, which was not successful.

After the merger, General Director of BMW Franz Josef Popp asked Design Director Max Friz to assess the Helios motorcycle. Upon completing his assessment, Friz suggested to Popp that the best thing that could be done with the Helios would be to dump it in the nearest lake. More specifically, Friz condemned the Douglas-style transverse-crankshaft layout, which heavily restricted the cooling of the rear cylinder.

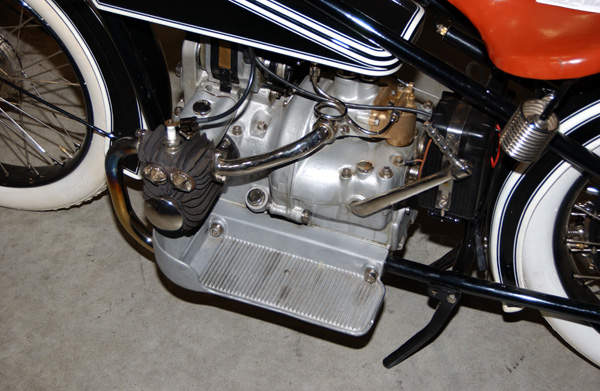
R32 engine and transmission unit

Popp and Friz then agreed to a near-term solution of redesigning the Helios to make it more saleable and a long-term solution of an all new motorcycle design. This new design was designated the BMW R32 and began production in 1923, becoming the first motorcycle to be badged as a BMW.

The M2B33 engine in the R32 had a displacement of 494 cc and had a cast-iron sidevalve cylinder/head unit. The engine produced 8.5 hp (6.3 kW), which propelled the R32 to a top speed of 95 km/h (59 mph). The engine and gear box formed a single unit. The new engine featured a recirculating wet sump oiling system at a time when most motorcycle manufacturers used a total-loss oiling system. BMW used this type of recirculating oiling system until 1969.

To counter the cooling problems encountered with the Helios, Friz oriented the R32's M2B33 boxer engine with the cylinder heads projecting out on each side for cooling, as used in the earlier British-manufactured ABC. Unlike the ABC, however, the R32 used shaft final drive from a flexible coupling on the gearbox output shaft to a pinion driving a ring gear on the rear wheel hub.

The R32 had a tubular steel frame with twin downtubes that continued under the engine to the rear wheel. The front fork had a trailing link design suspended by a leaf spring, similar to the forks used by Indian at the time. The rear wheel was rigidly mounted. In the original First Series, braking was accomplished solely with a "dummy rim" on the rear wheel with two padded brake shoes set within it. One would be operated by the, now traditional, right hand lever and the other by use of a heel actuated lever on the right side. Later years would reroute the front right lever and cable to a front drum brake.

== Legacy ==
The R32 established the boxer-twin, shaft-drive powertrain layout that BMW would use until the present. BMW used shaft drives in all of its motorcycles until the introduction of the F650 in 1994 and continues to use it on their boxer-twin motorcycles.

== See also ==
- History of BMW motorcycles
