= BMW M2B15 =

BMW M2 B15
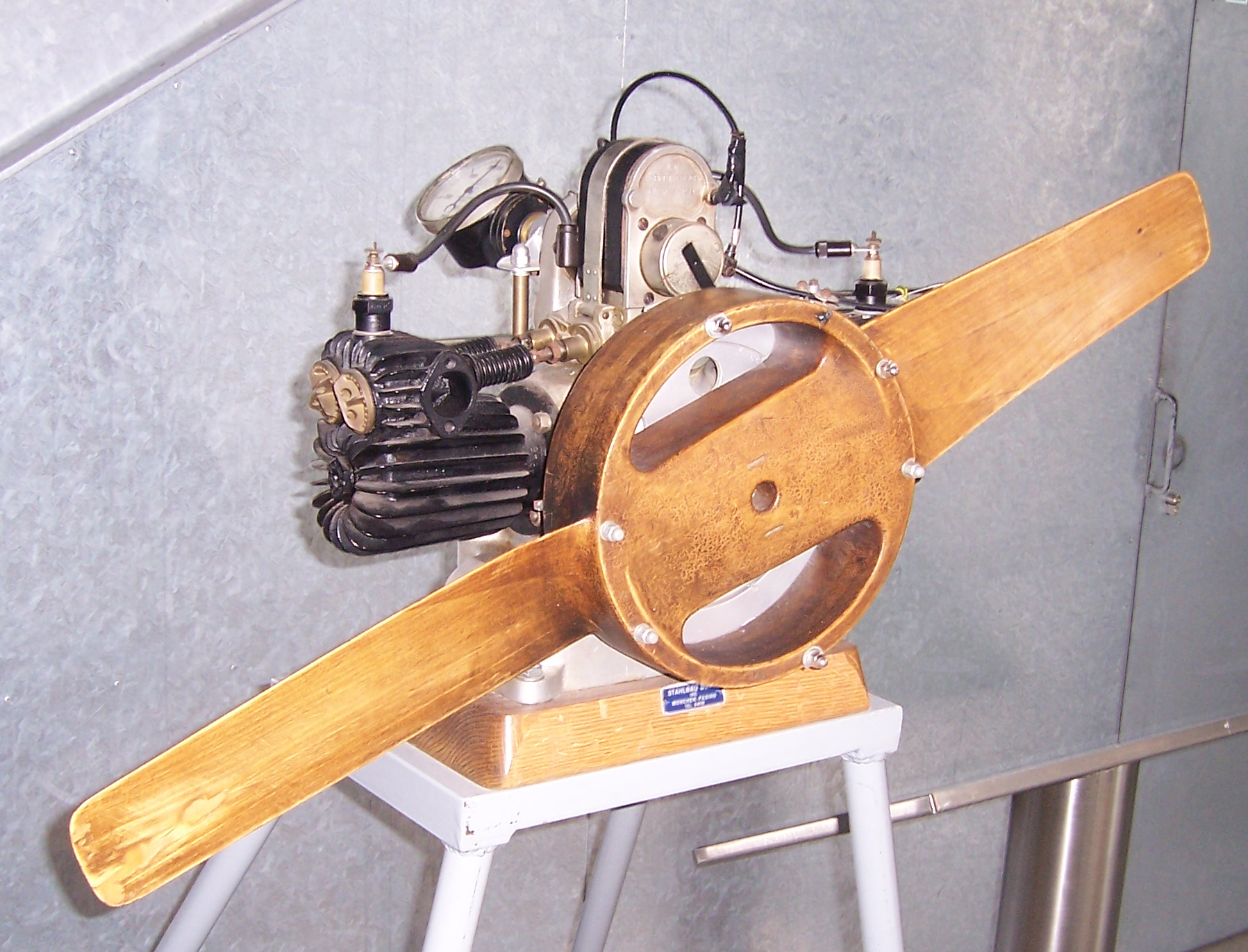
- BMW M2B15 at Deutsches Museum

Overview
- Manufacturer: BMW
- Also called: Bayern-Kleinmotor, Bayern Motor
- Production: 1920–1923

Layout
- Configuration: flat-twin
- Displacement: 494 cc (30.1 cu in)
- Cylinder bore: 68 mm (2.7 in)
- Piston stroke: 68 mm (2.7 in)
- Cylinder block material: cast iron
- Cylinder head material: cast iron, in unit with block
- Valvetrain: side-valve pushrod engine

Combustion
- Fuel system: BMW carburettor
- Fuel type: petrol
- Oil system: wet sump
- Cooling system: air-cooled

Output
- Power output: 6.5 hp (4.8 kW)

Dimensions
- Dry weight: 31 kg (68 lb)

The BMW M2B15 was BMW's first flat-twin engine. Manufactured from 1920 to 1923, the M2B15 was intended to be a portable industrial engine, but it was used by several German motorcycle manufacturers to power their motorcycles.

In 1920, BMW engineer Max Friz reverse-engineered the engine of foreman Martin Stolle's 1914 Douglas motorcycle and developed a similar 500 cc side-valve flat engine from it. This was referred to internally as the Type M2B15 and offered for sale officially as the "Bayern Motor". The engine was tried out by various motorcycle manufacturers. Starting in 1920, Victoria of Nuremberg used the engine in their KR 1 motorcycle, and other manufacturers such as SMW and Bison also fitted it.

Bayerische Flugzeugwerke used the M2B15 engine in their Helios motorcycle. BMW inherited the Helios when it was merged with BFW in 1922.
