= When Rover Met BMW =

5-part documentary series produced by the BBC in 1996

When Rover Met BMW is a five-part documentary series produced by the BBC in 1996. German motor company BMW had bought Rover in 1994 and the series follows the sometimes fraught relationship between the two.

== Overview ==
Episode one, Don't Mention The War, covers the launch of the Rover 200, analyses the press coverage this generated and also shows the reaction to BMW's appointment of a new chairman for Rover. The title of the first episode is a Basil Fawlty quote from the comedy series Fawlty Towers. By the final episode, Undercover Operations, Rover's chief executive, John Towers, has resigned and BMW have reshuffled the Rover board.

== List of episodes ==
- Don't Mention The War (first broadcast 5 November 1996)
- Identity Crisis (first broadcast 12 November 1996)
- A Job For Life (first broadcast 19 November 1996)
- Bonding (first broadcast 26 November 1996)
- Undercover Operations (first broadcast 3 December 1996)
