= Hanns Grewenig =

- Born: 30 September 1891; Straßburg, Alsace-Lorraine, German Empire
- Died: 6 April 1961 (aged 69); Munich, Bavaria, West Germany
- Occupation: Auto executive

Hanns Grewenig (30 September 1891 - 6 April 1961) was a German engineer who pursued a successful career in the German automobile industry. He was the Commercial Director and a leading member of the executive board at BMW between 1948 and 1957.

== Life ==
=== Early years ===
Hanns Grewenig was born in Strasbourg which at that time was in Germany. In 1911 he joined the Navy as a marine engineer. In 1917 he obtained his diploma as a Ship's Engineer after which he participated in the war, serving as chief engineer on a submarine. After the war ended Grewenig's career took a change of direction, as he undertook a commercial apprenticeship and then took charge of several vehicle service/repair shops. In 1927 he joined Ford, the US automobile manufacturer which in 1925, initially rather tentatively, had opened a vehicle assembly facility in the Western Port quarter of Berlin.

=== Opel ===
A year later, in 1928, he switched to General Motors (GM) who had an assembly facility at Berlin-Borsigwalde, on the same side of the city as the Ford business but slightly further from the city centre. The | facility assembled a small number of Chevrolets and Buicks for a few years around this time. However, in 1929, the year after Grevening joined the company GM purchased Opel, already Germany's largest car producer in terms of volume, but hitherto a family owned automobile manufacturer with a modern car plant at Rüsselsheim to the west. During the next decade Opel, backed by the investment capabilities of its Detroit parent, more than quadrupled its domestic market sales in the booming German automarket, and Grewenig's career followed a similarly upward trajectory. With GM-Opel he worked successively as Customer Services Director, Director for Production and Distribution of Replacement Parts, and Sales Director for the southern part of Germany, covering Bavaria, Württemberg, Baden und Hessen.

In 1935, encouraged by the government, Opel opened a new truck plant at Brandenburg an der Havel. Grewenig was appointed plant director, retaining this responsibility till 1938. That year he transferred to the company's main plant, at Rüsselsheim where he took over as Operations Director. The next year he was finally appointed a full member of the company's executive board.

=== Vomag ===
In 1941 Grewenig relocated to Plauen when he was recruited to take charge at Vomag. Vomag was a manufacturer of industrial sewing machines which had reacted to the decline in Plauen's textile business thirty years earlier by diversifying into trucks and buses. By 1941 it had switched to war production, becoming a major supplier of tanks to the military, especially the Jagdpanzer IV/70(V) Grewenig was mandated to improve efficiencies and expand production. The end of the war in May 1945, found what was left of Germany divided into four occupation zones. Plauen had been heavily bombed, leaving it, according to one source, one of the most completely destroyed towns in Germany. The town found itself on the southern edge of the Soviet occupation zone (after October 1949 the German Democratic Republic / East Germany). The Vomag plant had been approximately 40% destroyed by bombing, but by February 1946 was nevertheless ready for a return to truck production on a limited scale. At this point, however, the military administration ordered the remains of the factory to be disassembled, crated up and shipped to the Soviet Union as part of a reparations package that had, at least in principle, been agreed between the victorious powers before the end of the war. Sources indicate that Grewenig remained in charge at the Vomag plant till 1947. That year he crossed the (at this stage still completely porous) border separating the Soviet occupation zone from Bavaria, which had ended up in the US occupation zone (after May 1949 the German Federal Republic / West Germany).

=== BMW ===
Grewenig joined BMW as Commercial Director in 1948, retaining the position till 1957. Between 1948 and 1955 he combined the role with that of CEO (Geschäftsführer). In 1947 the military administration gave permission for the company's destroyed Munich plant to be rebuilt as a motorbike factory. The necessary investment amounted to 63 Million marks, leaving the company heavily indebted. Desperate shortage of cash would be a defining feature of Grewenig's time at the top of BMW. Motorbike production nevertheless resumed in 1948, which significantly was also the year of currency reform. 9,450 BMW motorbikes were produced in 1949, which had risen to 28,300 by 1952, although in the acute austerity of the period, most of the machines that found buyers were relatively basic: there was little demand for the expensive (and more profitable) heavy motorbikes for which BMW had been known in the 1930s and early 1940s.

BMW automobile production before the war had taken place at a plant in Eisenach to which the company no longer had access since it was in the Soviet occupation zone. There was nevertheless an awareness that if the economy continued to improve, growth in the motorbike market would not continue, and Grewenig was adamant that a return to automobile production was vital in order to provide a "second leg" if the company was have a long term future. Money to invest in production was a challenge however. To the west Mercedes-Benz still had their car plant and were achieving significant additional cash flow from their truck range. Most of Opel's factory had been disassembled and shipped to the Moscow area, but General Motors was cash rich and happy to invest in new plant. In the small car sector, a miraculous revival was unfolding at Volkswagen thanks to a pre-war design that had captured the imagination of the market. BMW's dire financial position ruled out investment in a new factory for volume production any time soon, but Bavaria, its population swollen by refugees created by the 1945 frontier changes, was rich in skilled craftsmen and wages were low. Grewenig and his senior colleagues accordingly determined that BMW's first West German passenger car should compete at the top end of the market, attracting a premium price for a small number of luxury saloon/sedan models.

Fritz Fiedler's 1951 proposal for a small BMW passenger car remained on the shelf, and the BMW 501 was unveiled at the Frankfurt Motor Show, though "development issues" delayed the start of production until late 1952. Powered at this stage by a compact 6-cylinder engine not massively changed since it had first appeared in the BMW 326 in 1936, the BMW 501 for 1952 was seen as seriously underpowered, and high warranty charges for the early cars indicated that it was also seriously underdeveloped at launch, reflecting the manufacturer's continuing acute cash shortage. Mercedes-Benz were also cash strapped, and their contender in the six cylinder class was in many respects a less elaborate design, but the Württembergers had invested in a much more modern engine. Applying a simplistic but telling comparison, contrasting the Mercedes-Benz 220 of 1952 with the BMW 501, Der Spiegel reported a power-to-weight ratio for the Mercedes of 16 kg of car weight per unit of declared Horsepower (Pferdestärke / PS), whereas the 65 PS engine of the BMW resulted in an anemic power-to-weight ratio of 19 kg of car weight per unit of declared horsepower, . Two years later a V8 engined 2.6 litre version addressed some of the criticisms of the BMW's sluggish performance, but the overall market for large cars in West Germany was still small, and it was dominated by Mercedes-Benz. BMW found customers for only about 3,000 cars annually. In some respects BMW displayed a bizarre "money no object" approach to their luxury car: a perfectly adequate fastener for the luggage locker (boot/trunk) could have been produced for 8 Marks, but BMW insisted on developing a superior fastener costed at 98 Marks. The high cost of the special fastener no doubt reflected the relatively small number of cars over which development costs had to be amortised. Low production volumes and, especially in the early 1950s, high warranty costs meant that the BMW 501 was never as profitable as the board had hoped.

While BMW contested the large car market, and the middle market was fought over by several manufacturers, the high volume small market in West Germany was becoming monopolised by just one car, the Volkswagen. A discussion between Hanns Grewenig and C. A. Drenowatz, the BMW distributor for Switzerland, took place early in 1954 at which the two men identified a way that BMW might secure for itself a slice of the small car market, inspired by a "motorbike with a body shell" ("verkleidetes Motorrad") that had been displayed at the Geneva Motorshow by Iso, an Italian manufacturer from Lombardy. The company looked for ways to exploit the idea in Germany, and in the end Grewenig, supported by his technical director Kurt Donath, was able to persuade an initially reluctant board to pay the Italians for a license to manufacture a version of the Iso design at the BMW Munich plant, adapted to take a motorbike engine from BMW's existing range along with modified front suspension to take he extra weight of the electric starter/dynamo motor that BMW fitted. With more than 160,000 sold between 1955 and 1962 the BMW Isetta became, in sheer volume terms, the most successful BMW model to date.

"... die ständig steigenden Reklamationen an Wagen und Isetten verursachen außerordentliche Aufwendungen der Produktion einerseits und ein katastrophal sinkendes Vertrauen der Kundschaft andererseits“

"... the constant rise in complaints about cars and Isettas causes extraordinary additional production costs on the one hand and a catastrophic loss of trust from the customer base on the other hand."

Hanns Grewenig in an internal memorandum (1956)

Nevertheless, the economies of scale that Volkswagen were by now achieving had the effect of depressing new car prices across the small car sector in West Germany, and BMW remained under acute financial pressure throughout the 1950s. As far as the BMW model range was concerned, it might be thought that the BMW 501 and the "bubble car" BMW Isetta had little in common. Unfortunately, one thing they did have in common was poor build quality, which continued to land the manufacturer with high warranty costs and, at a time when several (though not all) West German automakers were building a reputation for quality, left BMW at a competitive disadvantage in the market place: by the end of the decade dealers were accumulating stocks of unsold cars.

"... die sogenannten harten Kalkulationen des Herrn Donath vor Beginn der Wagenfertigung und die heutigen Werte der Letztkalkulation die außerordentliche Steigerung der Selbstkosten zeigten und damit den Schlüssel geben für die ständigen Verluste in der Wagenproduktion bis heute."

"... the so-called hard calculations provided by Mr Donath [Kurt Donath, technical director] before production, and the most recently calculated actual costs show an extraordinary increase: this provides the key to the continuing losses from automobile production "

Hanns Grewenig on the production costs of BMW 501, in discussions on cost estimates in respect of a possible new "mid-market" model (1956)

As automobile production continued to be loss making for BMW, tensions mounted at board level. By 1956 there was agreement that the company needed to plug the gaping gap in its range with a mid-size model, but Grewenig was determined to avoid the mistakes that had been made with the 501, which had been launched on the basis of cost estimates that in retrospect appeared ludicrously optimistic. He accused colleagues for failing to provide convincing cost estimates for proposed new models, but at this stage no prototypes had been produced so that any costing of proposals was a somewhat theoretical exercise. In the end Hanns Grewenig resigned from BMW in 1957. By mutual agreement with the chairman of the supervisory board, Hans Karl von Mangoldt-Reiboldt, Grewenig's resignation took place six months ahead of the date previous scheduled. His successor in charge of the executive board, Heinrich Richter-Brohm, would have a similarly challenging time at the top of the company, which culminated with an offer for BMW by Daimler-Benz. The Daimler Benz ambitions for BMW were thwarted only at the eleventh hour through a massive cash investment by the industrialist Herbert Quandt, which saved the business and, as matters turned out, gave BMW a long term future.

=== † ===
Hanns Grewenig died in a car accident in Munich on 6 April 1961.
