= BMW OHV V8 engine =

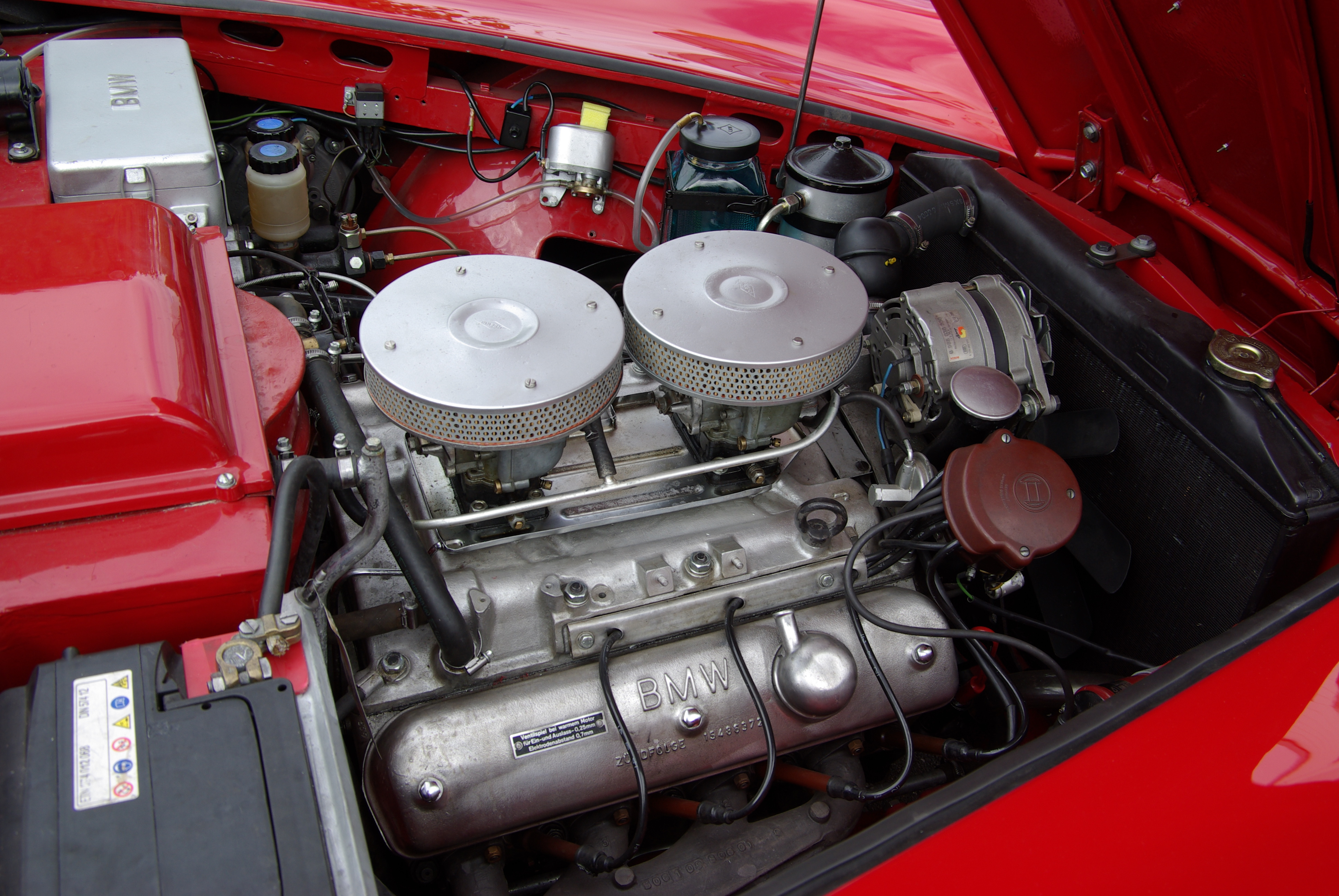
- 3.2-liter M503/1

Overview
- Production: 1954–1965

Layout
- Configuration: 90° V8
- Displacement: 2.6 L (2,580 cc); 3.2 L (3,168 cc)
- Cylinder bore: 74 mm (2.91 in); 82 mm (3.23 in)
- Piston stroke: 75 mm (2.95 in)
- Cylinder block material: Aluminium
- Cylinder head material: Aluminium
- Valvetrain: OHV

Combustion
- Fuel type: Petrol

Chronology
- Predecessor: None
- Successor: BMW M60

The BMW OHV V8 is an overhead valve V8 petrol engine produced from 1954 to 1965. It is BMW's first V8 engine, and BMW did not produce another V8 automobile engine until the BMW M60 in 1992.

The engine does not have an official model code, therefore it is often identified through being the only overhead valve ("OHV") V8 engine produced by BMW, since all other BMW V8 engines use a dual overhead camshaft valvetrain.

Although not a direct replacement, in 1965 the six-cylinder BMW M30 engine took the OHV V8's place at the top of BMW's engine range.

== Development ==
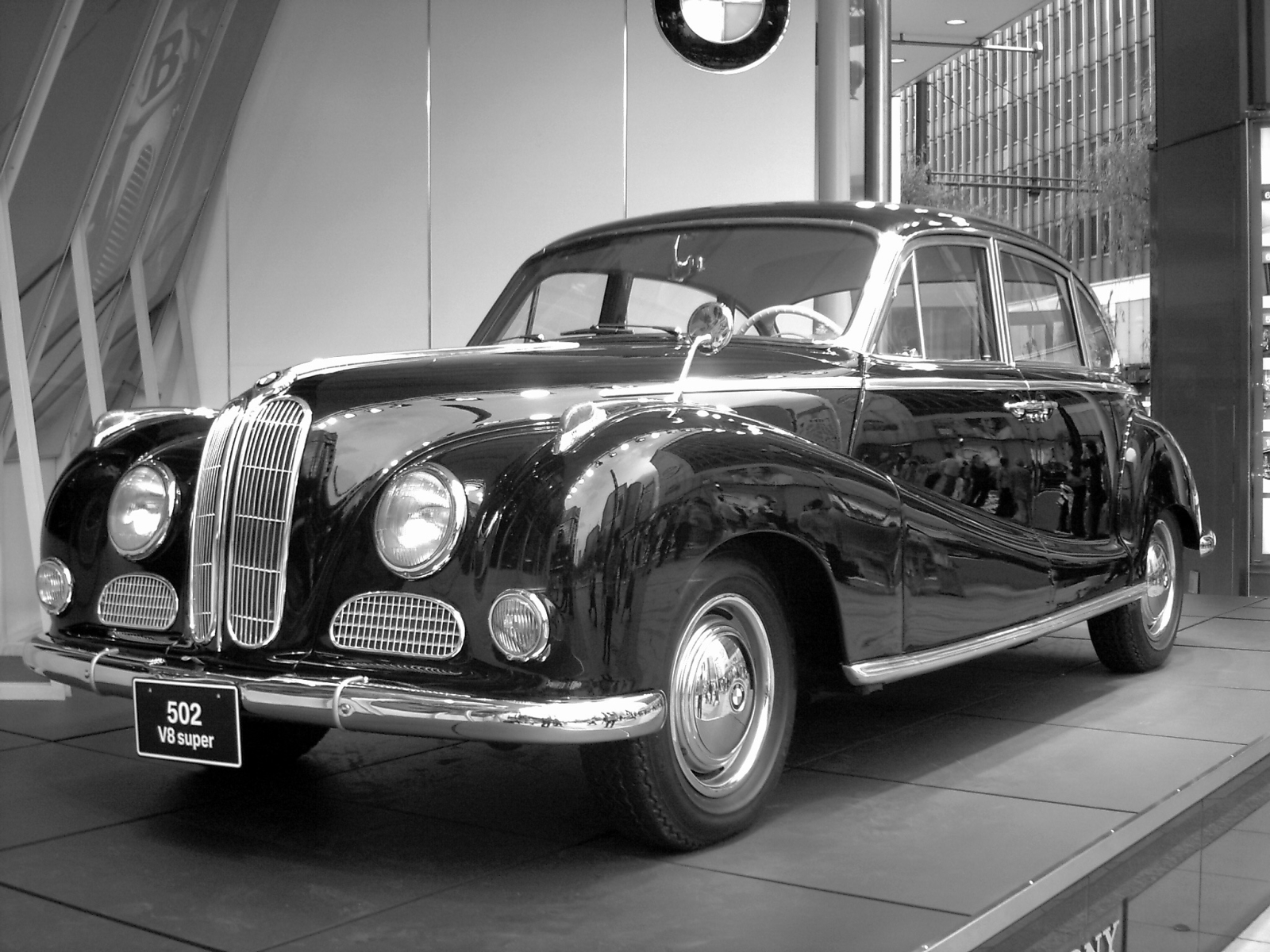
BMW 502

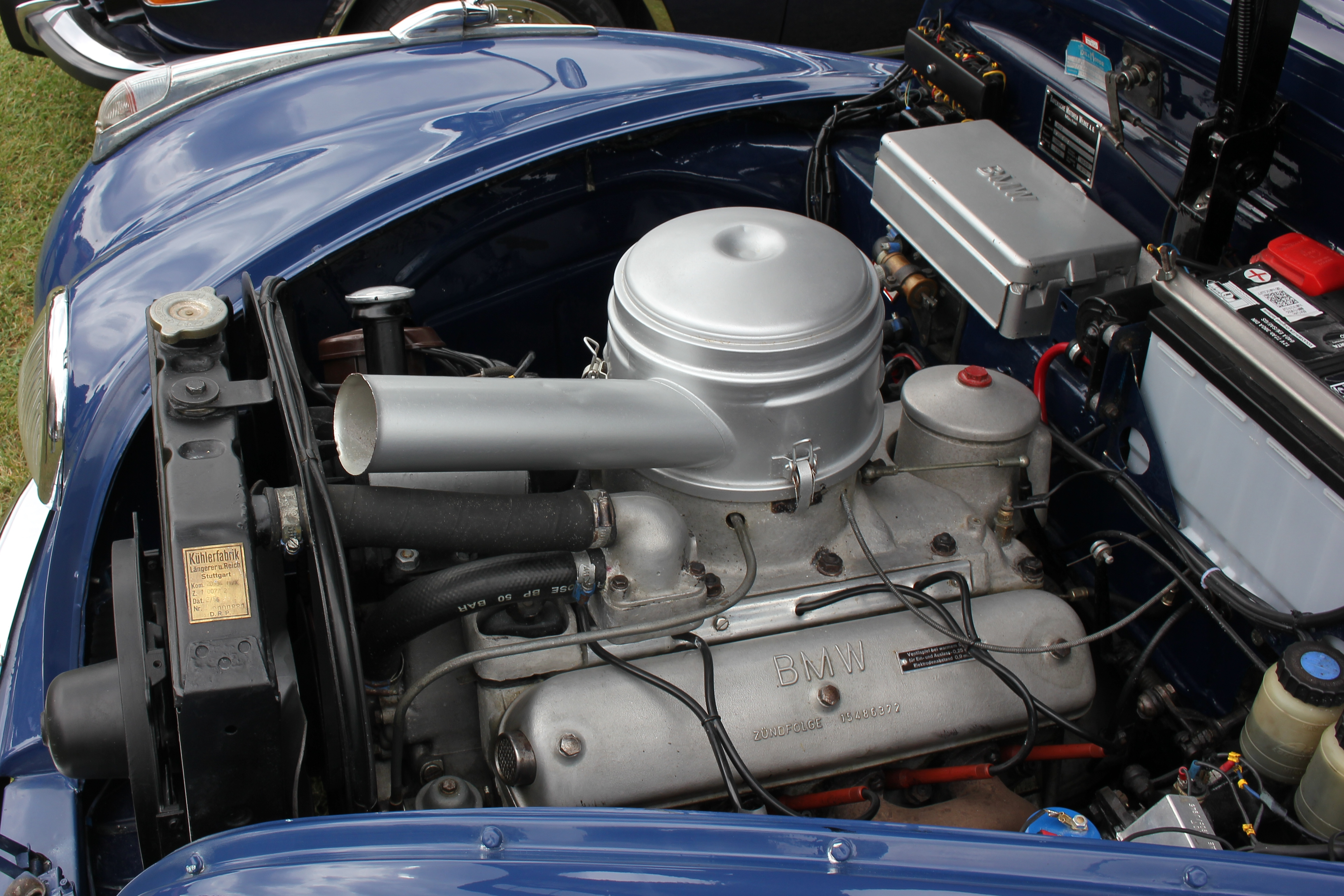
The M502/1 engine in a 1957 BMW 502

The BMW 501, which began production in 1952, was the first car produced by BMW after World War II. It was powered by the 2.0 L (122 cu in) BMW M337 straight-six engine (based on the pre-war BMW M78 engine), which produced only 65 PS (48 kW) and struggled with the 1,285 kg (2,833 lb) mass of the 501. The competing Mercedes-Benz W187 was powered by a larger 2.2 L (134 cu in) engine, which provided superior performance.

However, BMW had been developing a V8 engine since 1949, which was produced in 2.6 L (159 cu in) and 3.2 L (195 cu in) capacities. The design was finalized by Fritz Fiedler when he returned to BMW in 1952.

In 1954, the V8 engine was introduced (in 2.6 Litre form) in the BMW 502 - a higher specification version of the 501. In 1955, the 3.2 Litre version of the engine was introduced in the BMW 3.2, which was based on the 502.

== Design ==
At the time, unique features of the BMW OHV V8 included the aluminium construction of the block and head, and a coolant passage design that increased the block stiffness over typical engines with wet cylinder liners. The layout of the engine is a 90° V8 with cast iron wet liners and stiffening webs between the cylinders. Apart from the materials, the engine was similar in overall design to the Cadillac OHV V8 and Oldsmobile V8 engine of the late 1940s, with a central camshaft using pushrods to operating overhead valves in crossflow cylinder heads with wedge-shaped combustion chambers.

The 2,580 cc (157.4 cu in) versions have a bore of 74 mm (2.91 in) and a stroke of 75 mm (2.95 in). Initially, this engine used a two barrel Solex 30 PAAJ carburettor, a compression ratio of 7.0:1 and had a power output of 100 PS (74 kW).

The extra capacity of the 3,168 cc (193.3 cu in) version was achieved by increasing the bore to 82 mm (3.23 in). The larger engine initially used a single 32 mm (1.3 in) Zenith carburettor, a compression ratio of 7.2:1 and produced 120 PS (88 kW). The highest power output version of the BMW OHV V8 produced 160 PS (118 kW) and was used in the 3200 S released in 1961.

== Versions ==
The following is a summary of the engine's versions.

Engine	Displacement	Power	Torque	Years
M502/1	2,580 cc (157.4 cu in)	100 PS (74 kW; 99 bhp) at 4,800 rpm	184 N⋅m (136 lb⋅ft) at 2,500 rpm	1954–1961
M502/100	2,580 cc (157.4 cu in)	100 PS (74 kW; 99 bhp) at 4,800 rpm	185 N⋅m (136 lb⋅ft) at 2,500 rpm	1961–1963
M502/110, M533	2,580 cc (157.4 cu in)	110 PS (81 kW; 108 bhp) at 4,900 rpm	186 N⋅m (137 lb⋅ft) at 3,000 rpm	1961–1963
M506/1	3,168 cc (193.3 cu in)	120 PS (88 kW; 118 bhp) at 4,900 rpm	214 N⋅m (158 lb⋅ft) at 2,500 rpm	1955-1961
M506/140, M534	3,168 cc (193.3 cu in)	140 PS (103 kW; 138 bhp) at 5,400 rpm	242 N⋅m (178 lb⋅ft) at 3,000 rpm	1961-1963
M503/1	3,168 cc (193.3 cu in)	140 PS (103 kW; 138 bhp) at 4,800 rpm	220 N⋅m (162 lb⋅ft) at 3,800 rpm	1956-1961
M507/1	3,168 cc (193.3 cu in)	150 PS (110 kW; 148 bhp) at 5,000 rpm	240 N⋅m (177 lb⋅ft) at 4,000 rpm	1956-1959
M503/160, M532	3,168 cc (193.3 cu in)	160 PS (118 kW; 158 bhp) at 5,600 rpm	245 N⋅m (181 lb⋅ft) at 3,600 rpm	1961-1963

=== M502/1 ===
The original 2.6 L (2,580 cc) version of the engine was developed for the BMW 502 and was introduced with it in 1954. The compression ratio is 7.0:1 and it uses a Solex 30 PAAJ carburettor.

In 1958, the 501 V8 and 502 were renamed the 2.6 and 2.6 Luxus respectively, with no changes in engine specification.

Applications:

- 1954-1958 BMW 502 — 100 PS (74 kW)
- 1955-1958 BMW 501 V8 — 95 PS (70 kW).
- 1958-1961 BMW 2.6 — 95 PS (70 kW)
- 1958-1961 BMW 2.6 Luxus — 100 PS (74 kW)

=== M502/100, M502/110 and M533 ===
In the summer of 1961, the 2.6 L (2,580 cc) engines were uprated with the Zenith 32 NDIX carburetor from the earlier 3.2 L (3,168 cc) engines and a 7.5:1 compression ratio. With this upgrade, the 2.6 became the 2600 and the 2.6 Luxus became the 2600 L. These cars continued in production until December 1963

In 1963, the 2600 L was produced with the gearbox directly mounted to the engine. This version of the engine is known as the M533.

Applications:

- 1961-1963 BMW 2600 — 100 PS (74 kW)
- 1961-1963 BMW 2600L — 110 PS (81 kW)

=== M506/1 ===
The 3,168 cc (193.3 cu in) engine was developed in 1956, and was offered in the 502-based "BMW 3.2" sedan. The compression ratio is 7.2:1 and it uses a Zenith 32 NDIX carburettor.

Applications:

- 1955-1961 BMW 3.2

=== M503/1 and M507/1 ===
BMW's V8 sports models, the 503 and 507, used M503/1 and M507/1 engines respectively, each with a pair of Zenith 32 NDIX two-barrel carburetors. With these, and a compression ratio of 7.5:1, the 503's engine produced 140 PS (103 kW) at 5000 rpm. The tuning of the 507's engine went further, with high-lift cams, a different spark advance curve, polished combustion chamber surfaces, and a compression ratio of 7.8:1, producing 150 PS (110 kW) at 5000 rpm. Both models were discontinued in March 1959.

The twin-carburetor engine from the 503 was used in the 502-based 3.2 Super from 1957 to 1961.

Applications:

- 1956-1960 BMW 503 — 140 PS (103 kW)
- 1956-1959 BMW 507 — 150 PS (110 kW)
- 1957-1961 BMW 3.2 Super — 140 PS (103 kW)

=== M506/140, M503/160, M532 and M534 ===
In 1961, the "BMW 3.2" and "BMW 3.2 Super" sedans were replaced by the "BMW 3200 L" and "BMW 3200 S" sedans, with the engines upgraded to the M506/140 and M503/160 respectively. The increase in power came from larger Zenith 36 NDIX carburetors and a compression ratio of 9.0:1.

From 1963, the versions of the M503/160 and M506/140 with the gearbox directly mounted to the engine were called the M532 and M534 respectively.

Production of V8 sedans ended in 1963, but the engine from the 3200 S was used in the 3200 CS coupé from January 1962 to September 1965.

Applications:

- 1961-1963 BMW 3200 L — 140 PS (103 kW)
- 1961-1963 BMW 3200 S — 160 PS (118 kW)
- 1961-1965 BMW 3200 CS — 160 PS (118 kW)

== Use by other manufacturers ==
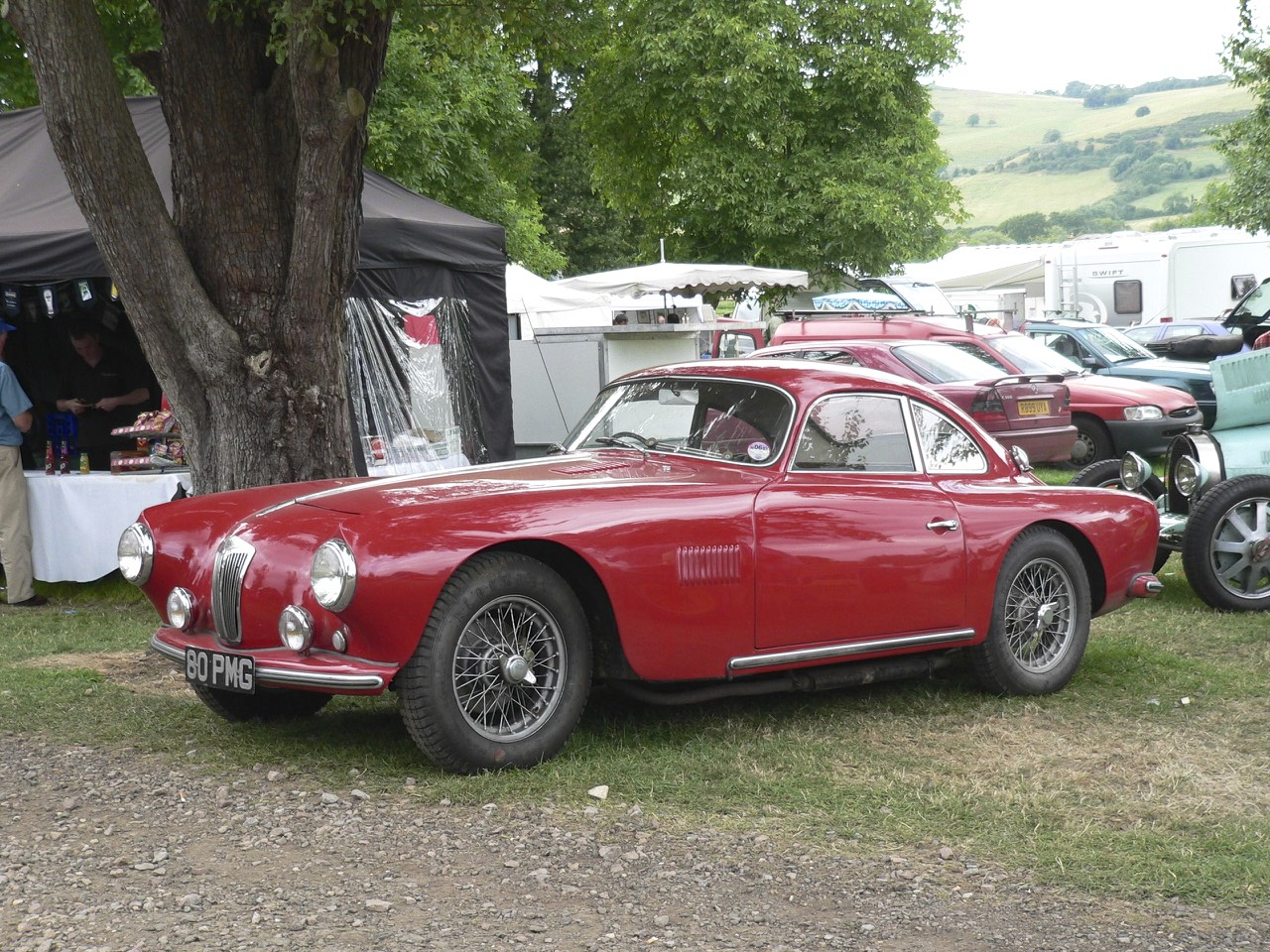
Frazer Nash Continental

=== Frazer-Nash Continental ===
Frazer-Nash was an importer of BMW cars into the United Kingdom and had used the Bristol straight-six engine, which was based on the BMW M328. The BMW OHV V8 was fitted to the Frazer Nash Continental model. The Continental was intended to be available with either the 2.6 or 3.2-litre V8, but only a single prototype was ever made, with the 3.2 engine. It was the last car Frazer-Nash made.

=== Talbot-Lago America ===
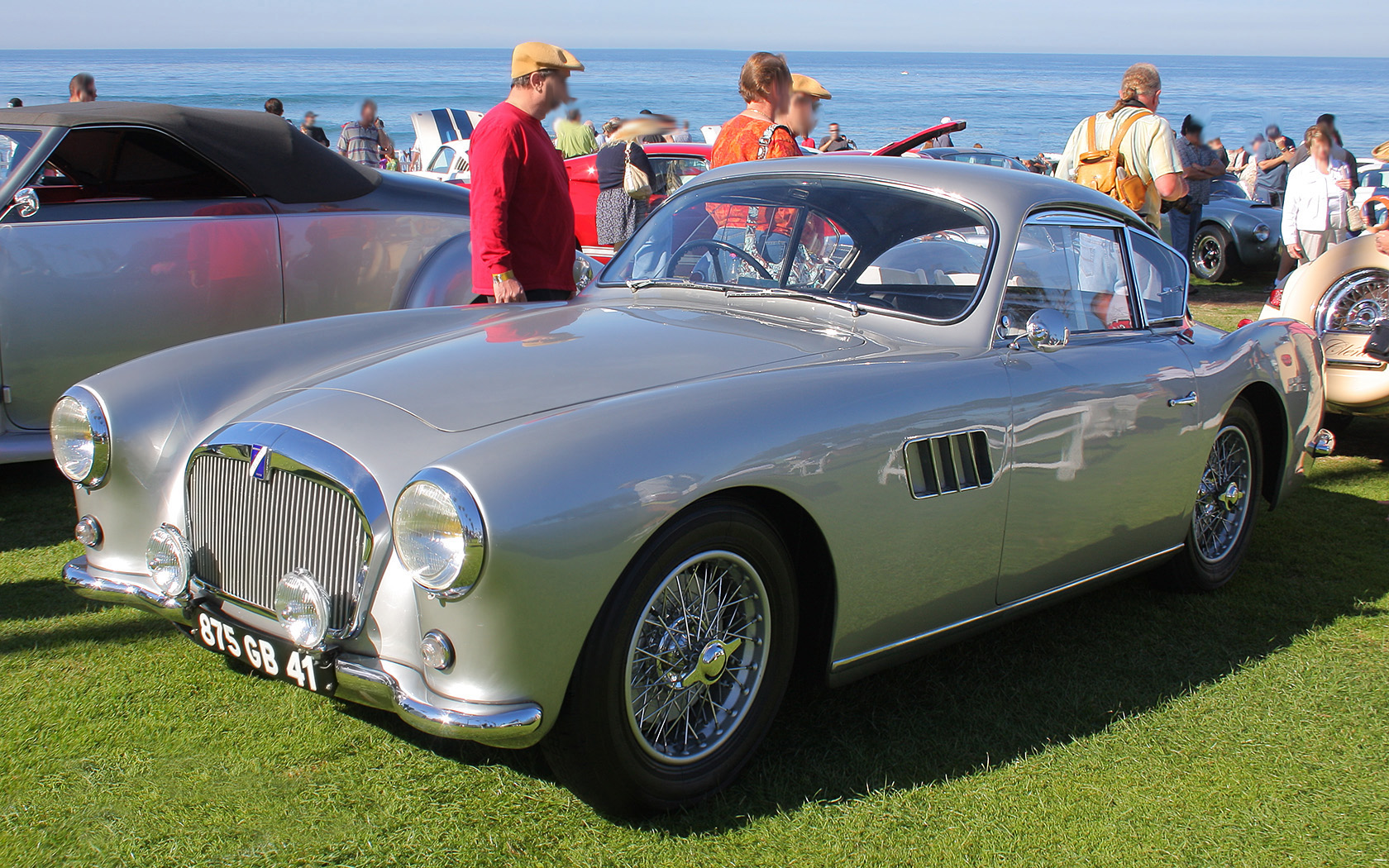
Talbot-Lago T14 LS

The 1955 Talbot-Lago Sport was originally powered by Talbot's own 2.5 Litre four-cylinder engine. In 1957, due to reliability problems, Talbot switched over to the BMW OHV V8 and renamed the car the Talbot-Lago America. Talbot reduced the bore to 72.5 mm (2.85 in) to keep the engine displacement beneath 2.5 litres, a major tax threshold in France at the time.
