= BMW 3200 CS =

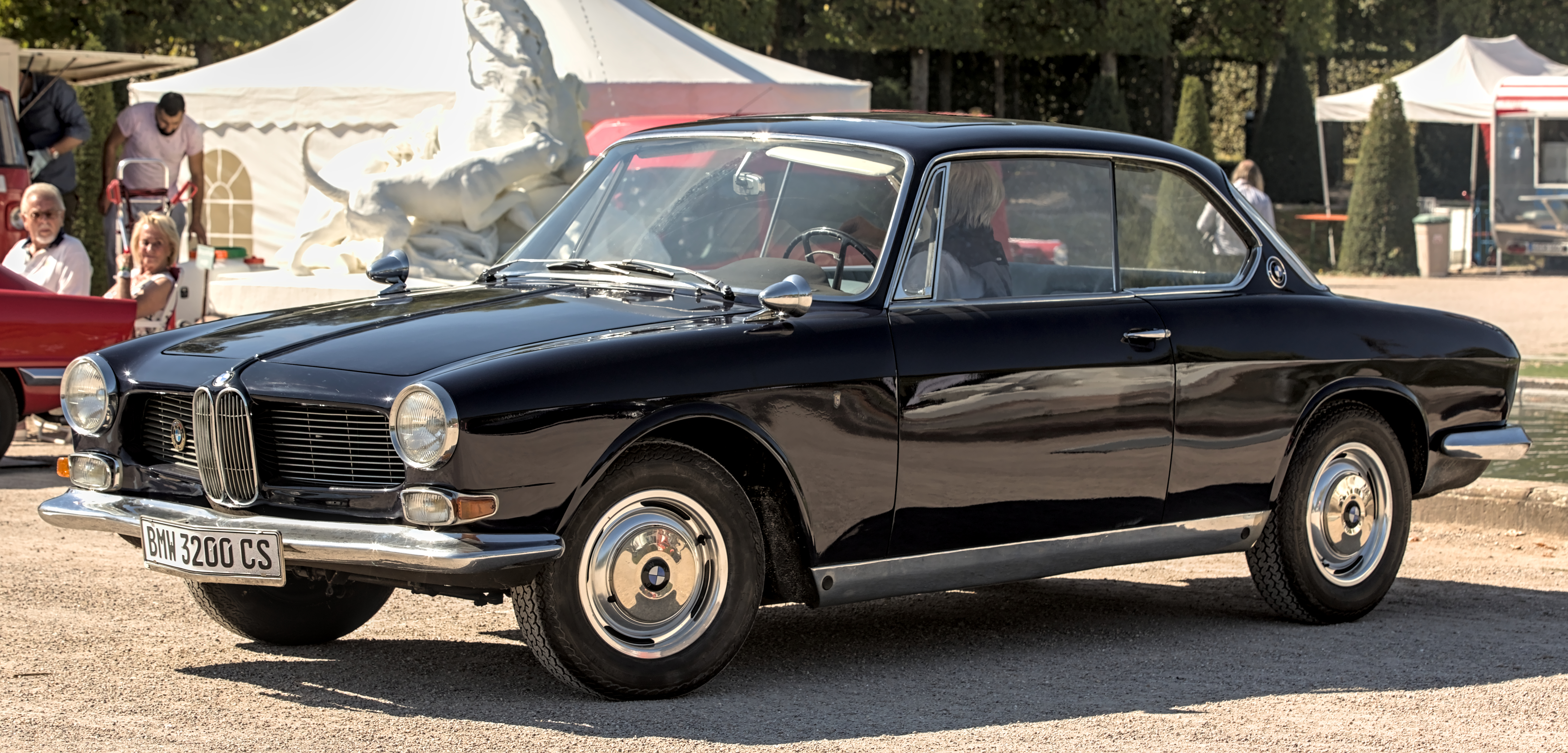

Overview
- Manufacturer: BMW
- Production: January 1962 – September 1965; 603 built
- Designer: Giorgetto Giugiaro at Bertone

Body and chassis
- Class: Grand tourer
- Body style: 2-door coupé
- Layout: FR layout
- Related: BMW 502

Powertrain
- Engine: BMW OHV V8
- Transmission: 4 speed manual

Dimensions
- Wheelbase: 2,840 mm (111.8 in)
- Length: 4,850 mm (190.9 in)
- Width: 1,760 mm (69.3 in)
- Height: 1,470 mm (57.9 in)
- Curb weight: 1,500 kg (3,306.9 lb)

Chronology
- Predecessor: BMW 503
- Successor: BMW New Class coupé

The BMW 3200 CS was a sports touring car manufactured by BMW between January 1962 and September 1965. It was designed by Bertone and was introduced at the 1961 Frankfurt Motor Show. More than five hundred were built.

The 3200 CS was the final variation on BMW's early postwar luxury platform that began with the 501 introduced in 1951. The styling of the 3200 CS influenced the 2000 CS coupe version of the New Class and the later New Six coupes.

It was the first BMW to feature the Hofmeister kink (which would become one of the company's trademark design elements).

== Concept and design ==
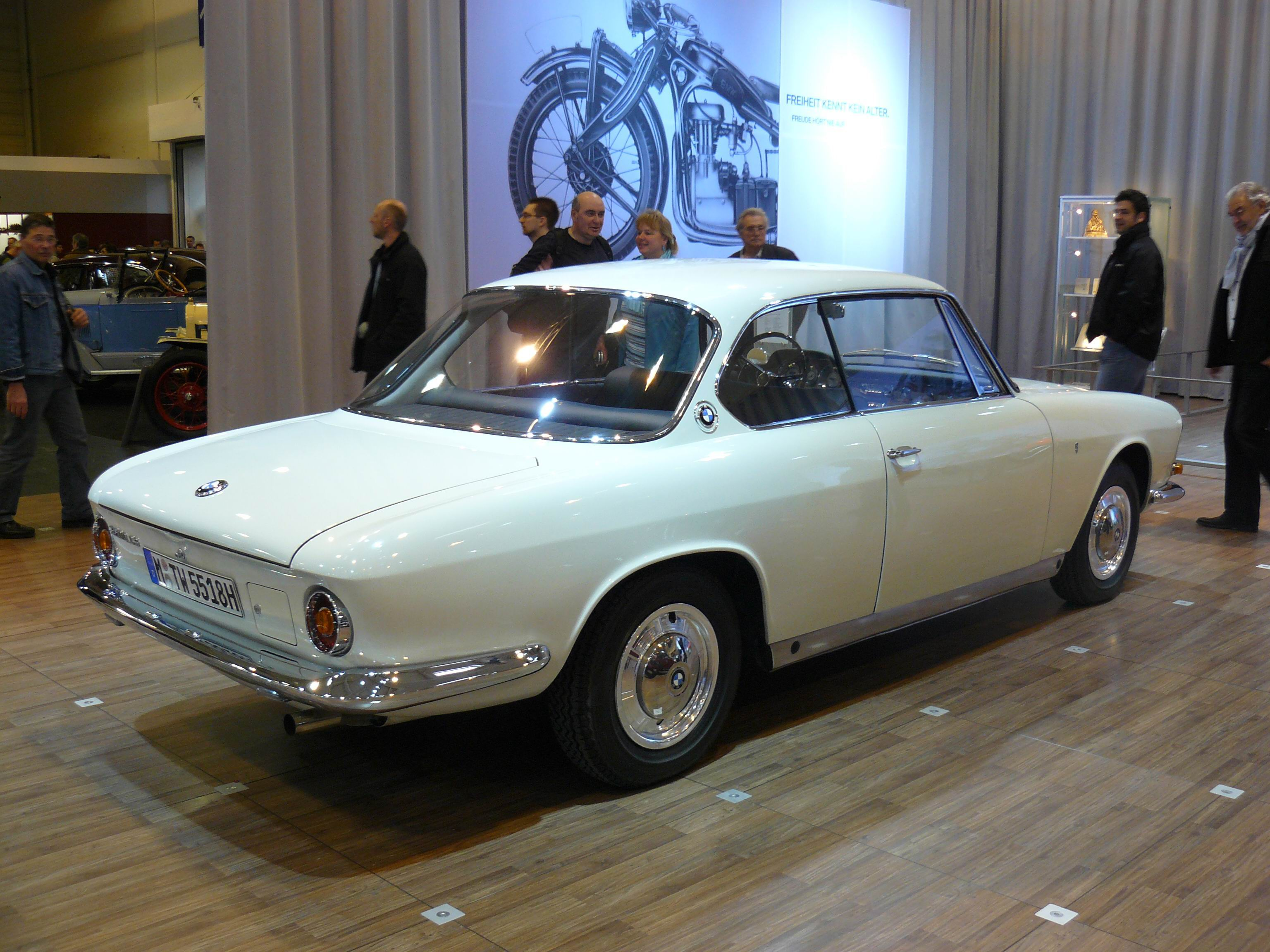
1965 BMW 3200 CS

In 1960, Helmut Werner Bonsch, BMW's marketing manager, discovered that the Pininfarina body for the Lancia Flaminia coupe would fit on the chassis of the BMW 3200L sedan without major modification. He proposed to BMW's management to commission Pininfarina to build Flaminia coupe bodies with BMW grilles in order to create a successor to the 503, which had been discontinued in 1959.

After deliberation, the management rejected Bonsch's proposal and instead ordered chief engineer Fritz Fiedler to commission Bertone to design and manufacture a coupe body for the 3200S. This used a perimeter frame, a 3,168 cc (193.3 cu in), twin-carburetor version of the BMW OHV V8 engine, delivering 160 horsepower (120 kW), a four speed manual gear box, a live rear axle, disc brakes on the front wheels, and torsion bar springs at all four wheels.

== Reception ==
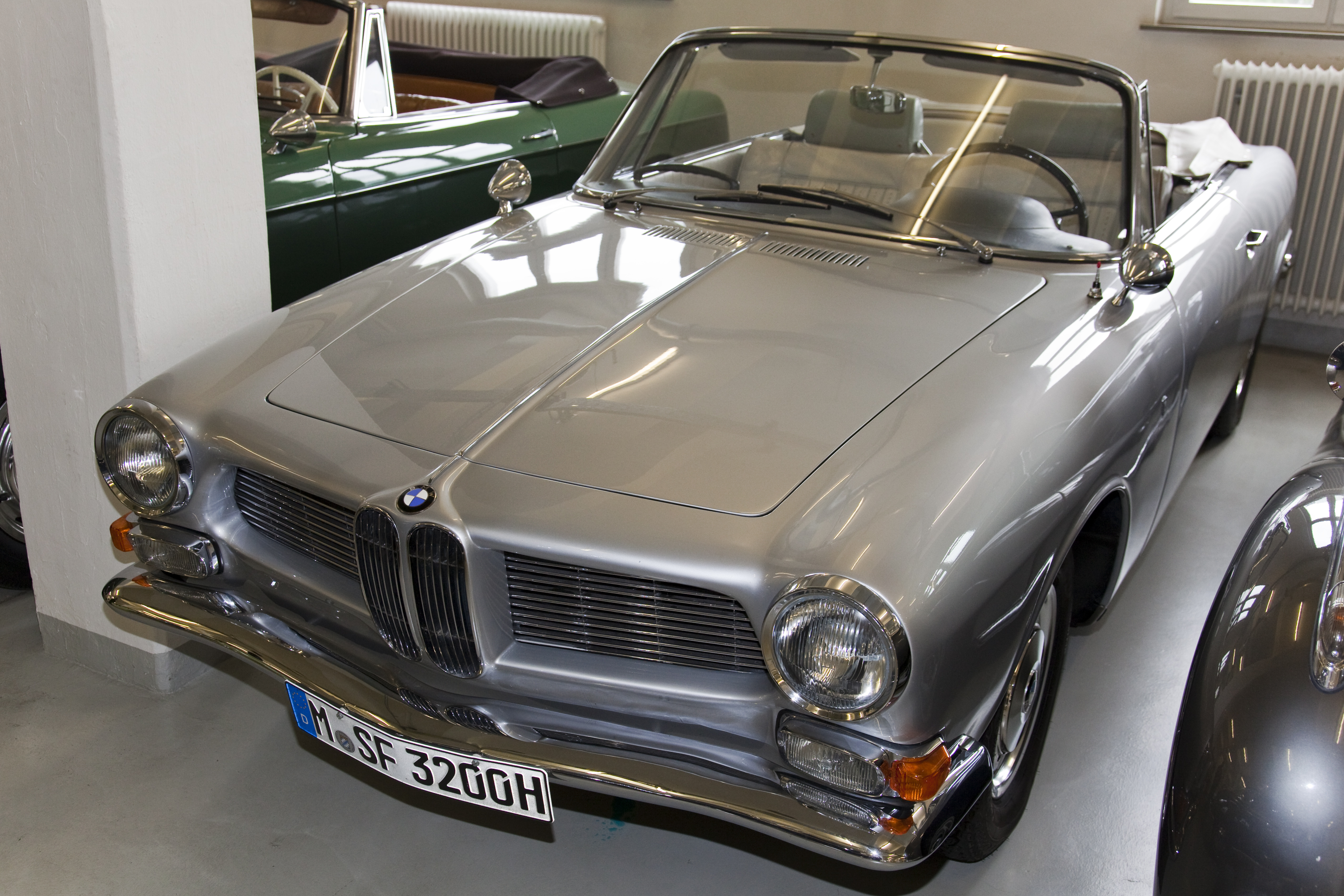
The only BMW 3200 CS convertible, made for major shareholder Herbert Quandt

The 3200 CS was introduced at the 1961 Frankfurt Motor Show alongside the BMW 1500. While the 1500 represented a completely new direction for BMW, the 3200 CS was based on the chassis of a car introduced at the Frankfurt show ten years earlier.

The 3200 CS was built from January 1962 to September 1965. Sources differ concerning numbers produced.

One 3200 CS convertible was built by BMW for their major shareholder, Herbert Quandt.

== Legacy ==
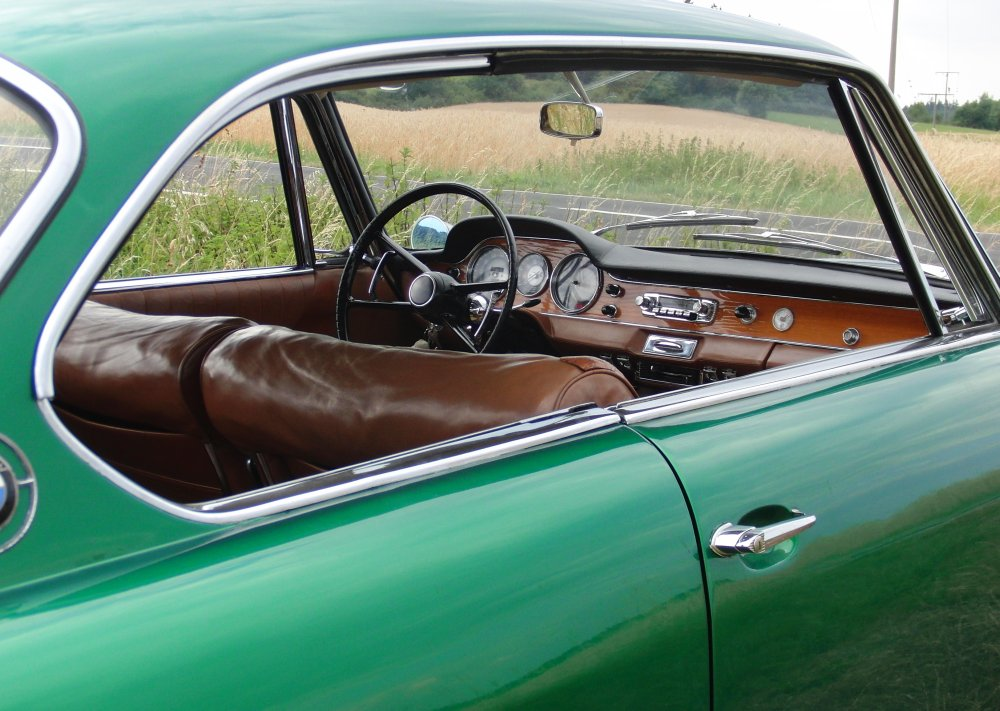
View of the interior showing the Hofmeister kink that would emerge as a feature of BMW design

The 3200 CS was the end of an era. It was the last of BMW's early postwar luxury cars. As such, it was the last BMW automobile to have pushrod-operated engine valves, a perimeter frame, or a solid rear axle.

Stylistically, however, the 3200 CS gave a view of what was to come. The low beltline, tall greenhouse and thin pillars of the 3200 CS became a template for BMW's later coupes, including the 2000 C and CS coupes based on the New Class sedans, and the E9 "New Six" coupes. Both BMW cars introduced at the 1961 Frankfurt show, the 3200 CS and the 1500, featured what became known as the Hofmeister kink, but sales started only in 1962 and it was the 3200 CS, sold from February 1962, which was the first BMW offered for sale incorporating this styling cue.
