= BMW 503 =

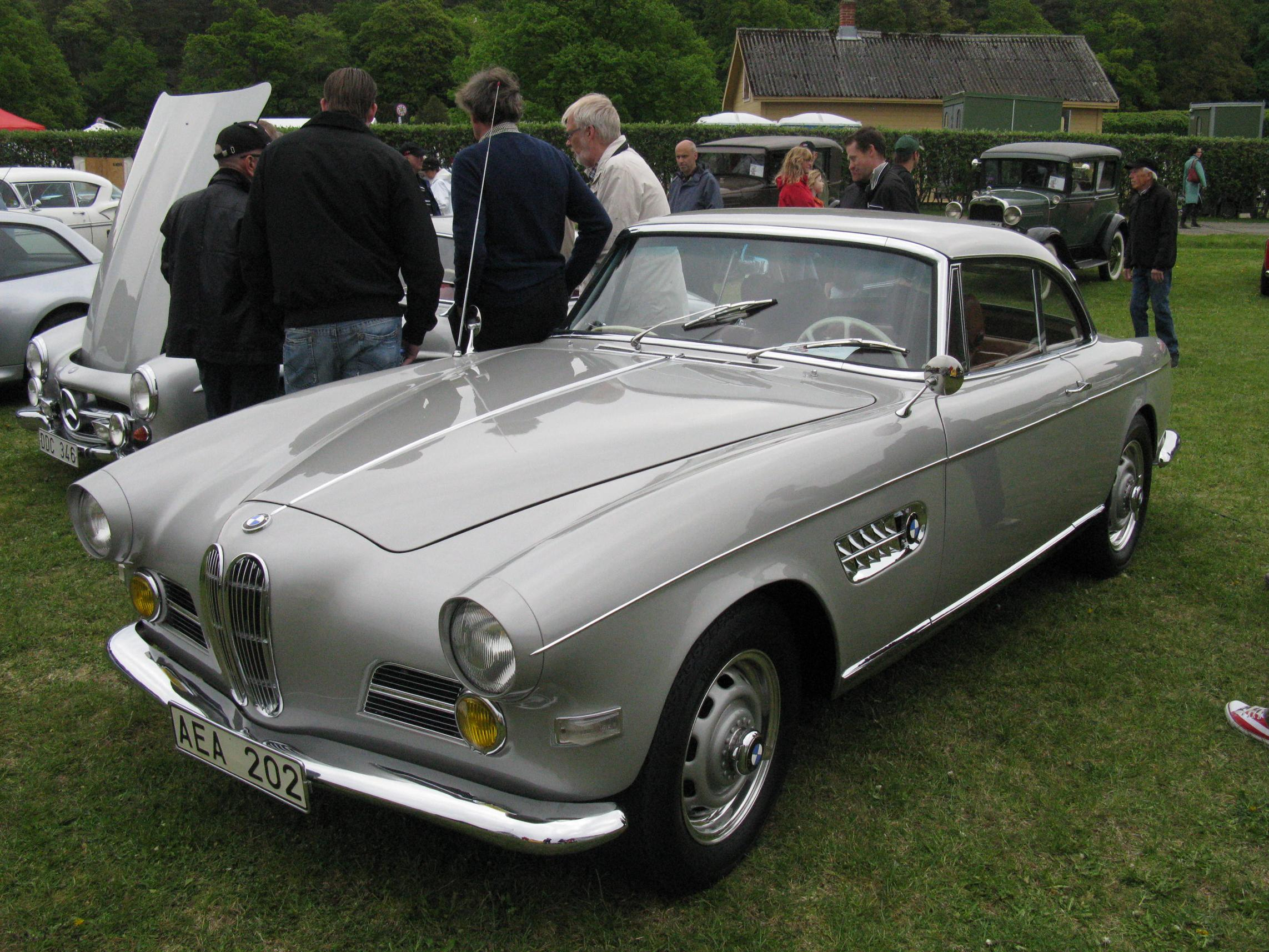

Overview
- Manufacturer: Bayerische Motoren Werke AG (BMW)
- Production: May 1956 – March 1959; 413 built
- Designer: Albrecht von Goertz

Body and chassis
- Class: Grand tourer (S)
- Body style: 2-door 2+2 seater coupe 2-door 2+2 seater cabriolet
- Layout: FR layout
- Related: BMW 507; BMW 502

Powertrain
- Engine: 3,168 cc (193 cu in) BMW OHV V8
- Transmission: 4-speed manual

Dimensions
- Wheelbase: 2,835 mm (111.6 in)
- Length: 4,750 mm (187 in)
- Width: 1,710 mm (67 in)
- Height: 1,440 mm (57 in)
- Curb weight: 1,500 kg (3,300 lb) approximately

Chronology
- Predecessor: BMW 327
- Successor: BMW 3200 CS

The BMW 503 is a two-door 2+2 gran turismo manufactured by German automaker BMW from 1956 until 1959. The company developed the 503, built in coupé and cabriolet body styles, alongside the 507 roadster. The 503 and 507 cost about twice their projected price and did not recover their development costs. During production from May 1956 to March 1959, 413 units of the 503 were built, 139 of which were Cabriolets.

== Concept and design ==
Hanns Grewenig, sales manager of BMW, repeatedly requested the development of a sports car based on their 501 and 502 luxury cars, and which could take advantage of their new 3.2 L V8 all-aluminium engine. He vetoed a proposal by chief engineer Fritz Feidler to develop a small car called the 331 on the basis that what BMW needed was a new luxury car more in keeping with its upmarket image. He also felt that BMW did not have the capacity then to manufacture in quantity, but could make a smaller number of luxury cars with a higher profit margin per unit.

In early 1954, influenced by the public reaction to the Mercedes-Benz 300 SL and 220 S Coupé/Cabriolet show cars in New York in February 1954, the management of BMW approved the project.

The initial designs for the 503 were the work of Kurt Bredschneider, head of the body department, and he produced the preliminary drawings which showed the bodywork that went through to the final design mostly unchanged. Max Hoffman, an influential automobile importer in the United States, saw early design sketches by BMW's Ernst Loof for the subsequent 507 and suggested to industrial designer Albrecht von Goertz that he should submit design proposals to BMW for both cars. Based on these proposals, BMW contracted Goertz to consider the existing design of the 503 and to design the 507 in November 1954.

The 503 was noted for having a cleaner and more modern design than the "Baroque Angel" 501-based sedans. The cabriolet version of the 503 was the first European convertible with an electro hydraulic hood and windows. Only 3 RHD cabriolets were hand made for the British market.

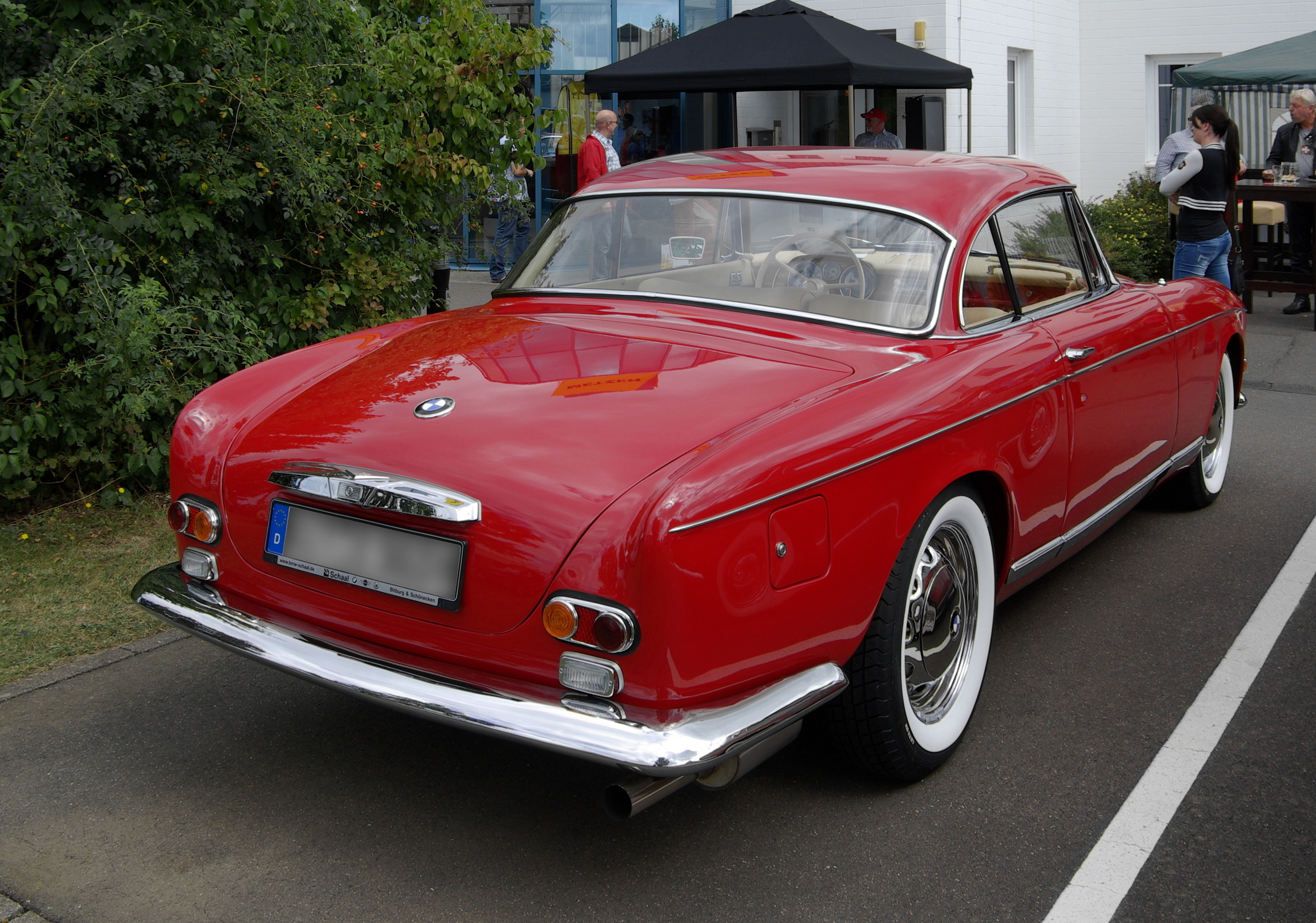
BMW 503 coupe

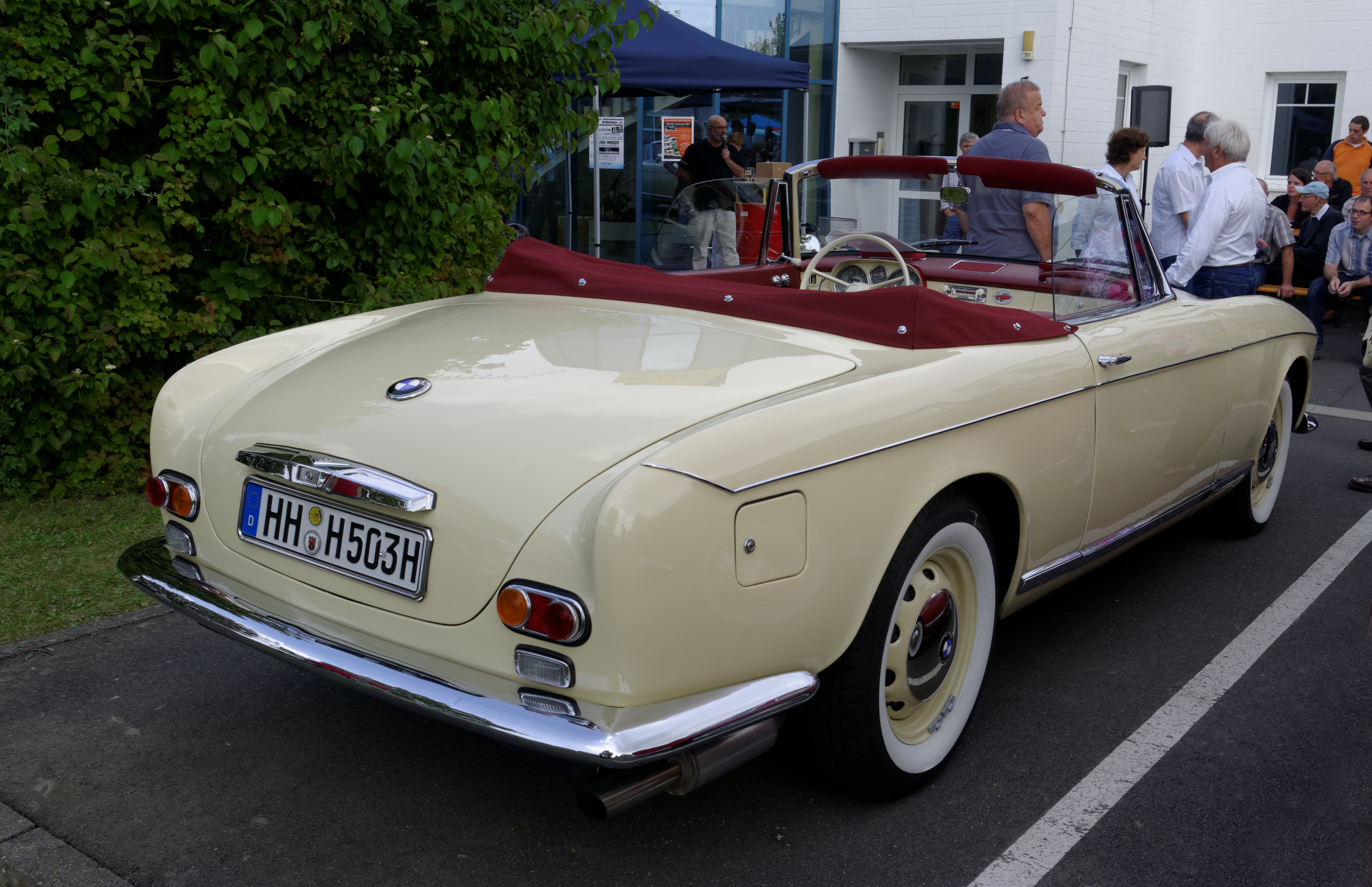
BMW 503 Cabriolet

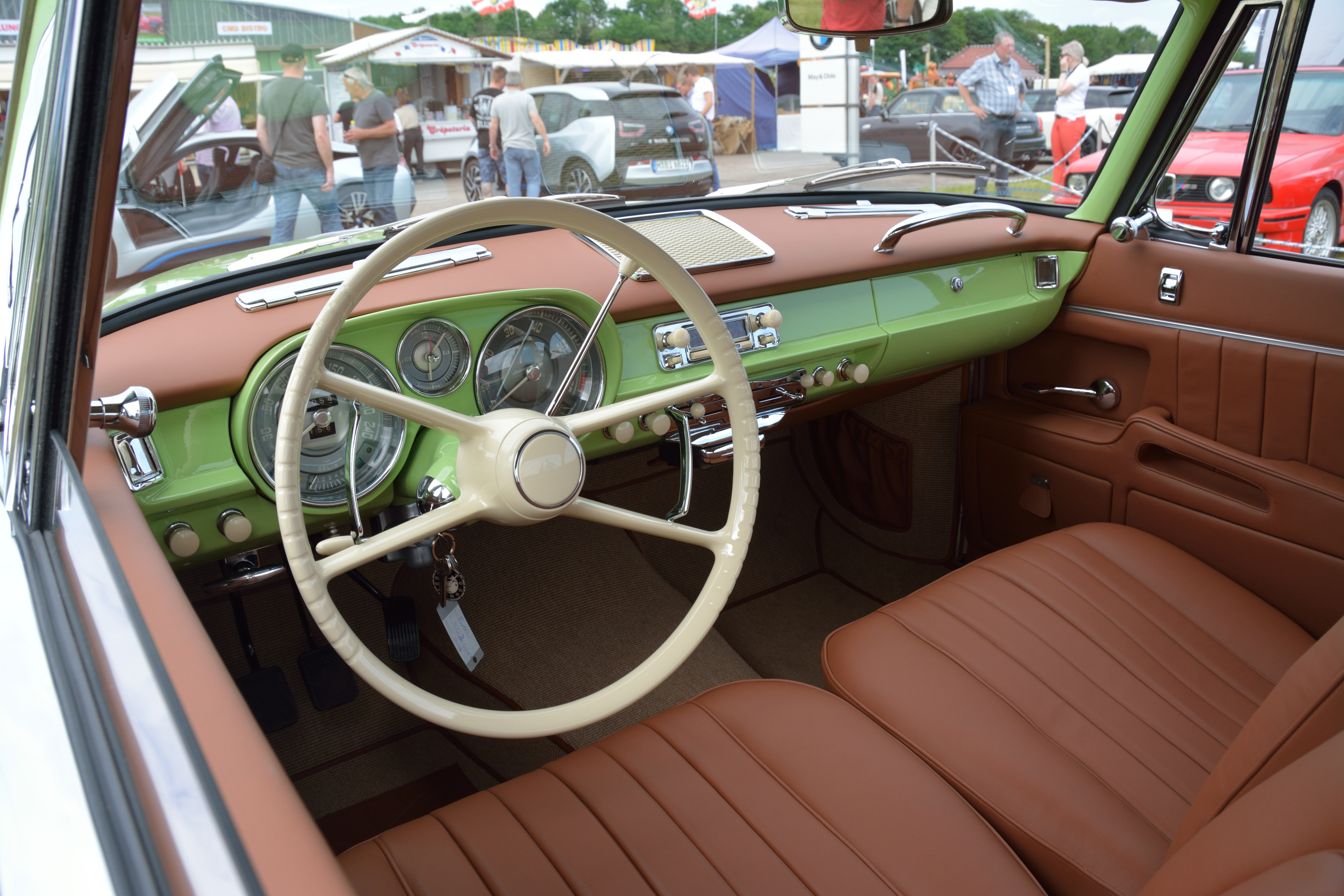
BMW 503 coupe interior

== Engineering and development ==
Tasked with designing rolling chassis for two cars while using as much as possible from the existing 502 sedan, engineer Fritz Fiedler designed two versions of a new ladder frame, one with the same wheelbase as the 502, and one with a shortened wheelbase. The long-wheelbase version was used in the 503. Both cars used the steering system and a variant of the front suspension system from the 502; the 503 also used the 502's rear suspension. As originally designed, the 503 used the 502's remote gearbox placement and shift linkage. Both cars used the braking system developed for the 502, using drum brakes with vacuum assist. From 1957 all 503s were fitted with discs on the front as a result of recommendations from John Surtees who had bought a 507. All 503s were configured for left hand drive except for three Coupés and three Cabriolets handbuilt for the UK market.

The perimeter chassis (so designed to keep driver and passengers safe in a collision) was constructed of sheet steel, as was the bulkhead, inner wings and some body bracing. The bodywork, bonnet, doors and bootlid were made of aluminium/magnesium alloy, the original aluminium having found to be too soft on the prototypes. The dashboard assembly was another hefty cast aluminium structure, with the cast glove box lid weighing as much as an ordinary dashboard on lesser cars. The side vents on the dashboard were discontinued in February 1957, the resulting hole being covered by a blanking plate being welded in which occasionally caused corrosion problems around the weld later on. It was intended that Baur should manufacture the bodies, and indeed they produced a prototype, but in the end they were hand built in house. Despite some claims by owners and auction houses, no 503 bodies were either designed or built by Bertone.

The Mark 2 version from September 1957 resulted in few outward changes. The chrome trim strip along the side remained straight at the rear, rather than kicking up at an angle. The ashtray moved from beneath the dash to adjacent to the speaker grille above it.

Both cars used the 3.2 L version of the V8 engine developed for the 502, but with two carburettors and with an improved lubrication system using a chain-driven oil pump. The 503's V8 had a compression ratio of 7.5:1 and yielded 140 bhp (104 kW; 142 PS) at 4800 rpm. Some UK 503s were delivered tuned to 507 specification, either by BMW or by AFN Ltd, the BMW Concessionaires for the UK; these engines developed 150 bhp.

The 503 had sixteen-inch wheels and standard final drive ratio of 3.90:1, A final drive ratio of 3.42:1 was optional. Acceleration of the 503 in standard tune from standstill to 100 km/h (62 mph) has been estimated at 11–13 seconds since there are no reliable contemporary figures available; the top speed of the 503 is about 120 miles per hour (193 km/h). Some cars were ordered with uprated engines with increased performance from standard.

Also for the Mark 2 from September 1957, the 503's drivetrain was revised. The gearbox was bolted to the engine and the gear lever was moved from the steering column to the floor. All RHD cars had floor changes.

== Reception ==
Hoffman had wanted BMW's sports and GT cars to be positioned between Triumph's sports cars and the Mercedes-Benz 190 SL, at a selling price close to US$5,000 ($60,093 in 2025 dollars). He told BMW he would order thousands of their sports cars at a purchase price of DM12,000. BMW, however, saw themselves as catering to the wealthy and aristocratic, and were not interested in cut price sports cars.

After its introduction at the Frankfurt Motor Show in September 1955, the 503 began production in May 1956 with a selling price of DM29,500, while the 507 roadster sold for DM26,500 when it began production seven months later, twice the price that Hoffman had hoped for.

Battista "Pinin" Farina, felt the 503 was superior in design to the 507, However, while neither the 503 nor the 507 sold well enough to earn a profit, the larger, more luxurious, more elegant, and more expensive 503 sold 412 units to the 507 roadster's 253. The problem with the 507 Roadster was that the performance did not match its looks or the price in the US market that was used to big V8 cars. Another difficulty for both cars was that Hoffman took fright at the very high price and cancelled his arrangement with BMW. Thus BMW had no dealership or servicing arrangements in the US which potential purchasers were wary about.

The 503 did better amongst the upper levels of society in Europe, (particularly Germany and Switzerland) with many going to film stars (Curd Jürgens and others) Heads of State (e.g. Tito) and the nobility (e.g. Count Faber-Castell) and it won numerous gold medals in International shows at the time. Production ended in March 1959.

== Legacy ==
The 503 was BMW's first postwar sports coupé. It was replaced by the Bertone-bodied BMW 3200 CS in 1962.
