= Funkstreife Isar 12 =

German television series

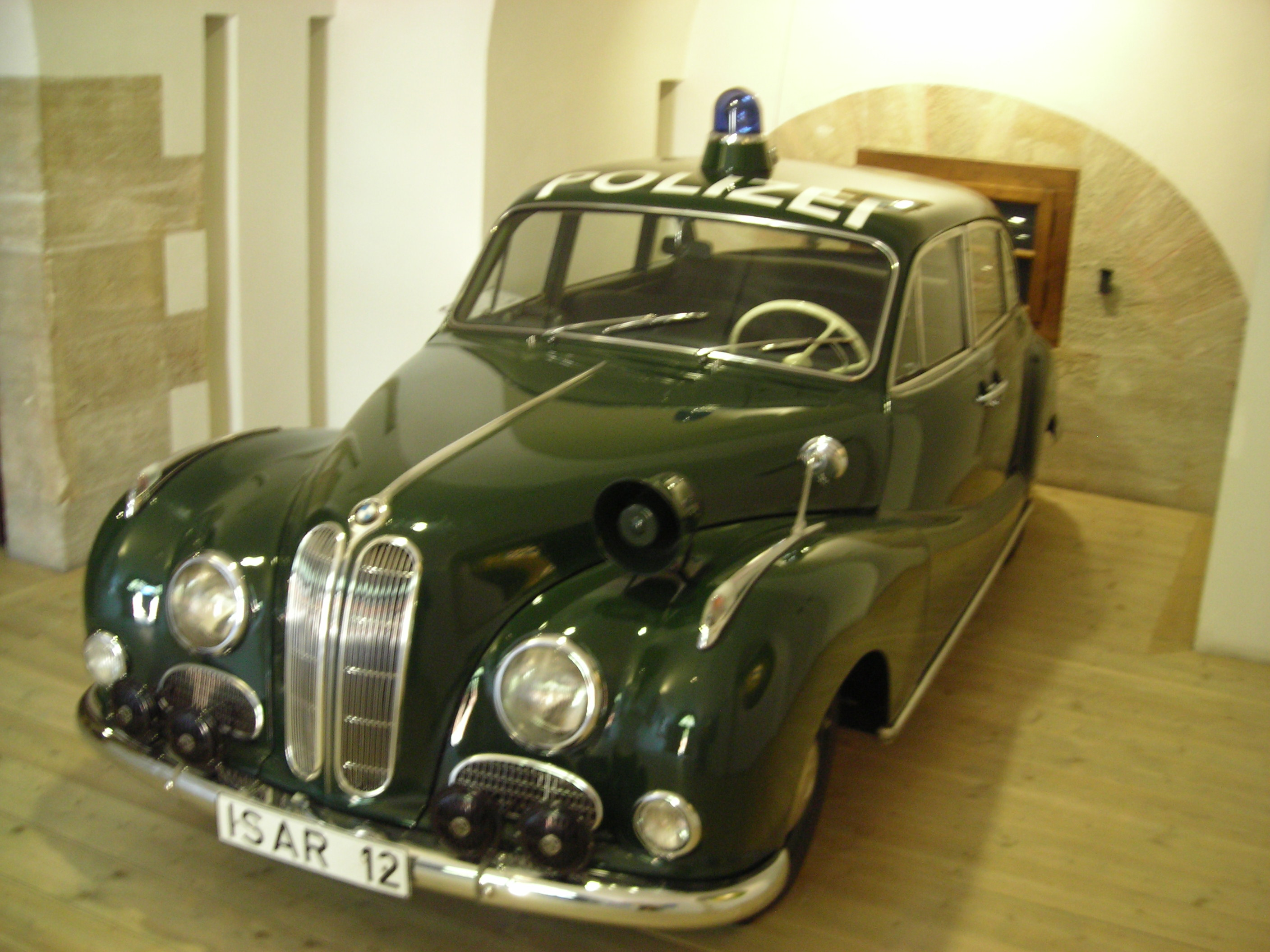
- Police patrol car (BMW 501)
- Created by: Bert Grund
- Starring: Karl Tischlinger; Wilmut Borell
- Country of origin: West Germany
- No. of seasons: 3
- No. of episodes: 35

Production
- Running time: 20 minutes

Original release
- Network: Das Erste
- Release: January 10, 1961 – October 17, 1963

Funkstreife Isar 12 is a German television series about a Munich police patrol unit.

The main characters are police sergeant (Polizeimeister) Alois Huber, portrayed by Karl Tischlinger, and his partner, Polizeihauptwachtmeister Herbert Dambrowski, portrayed by Wilmut Borell. They drove a BMW 501 police patrol car with callsign Isar-12.

== See also ==
- List of German television series
