= BMW M337 =

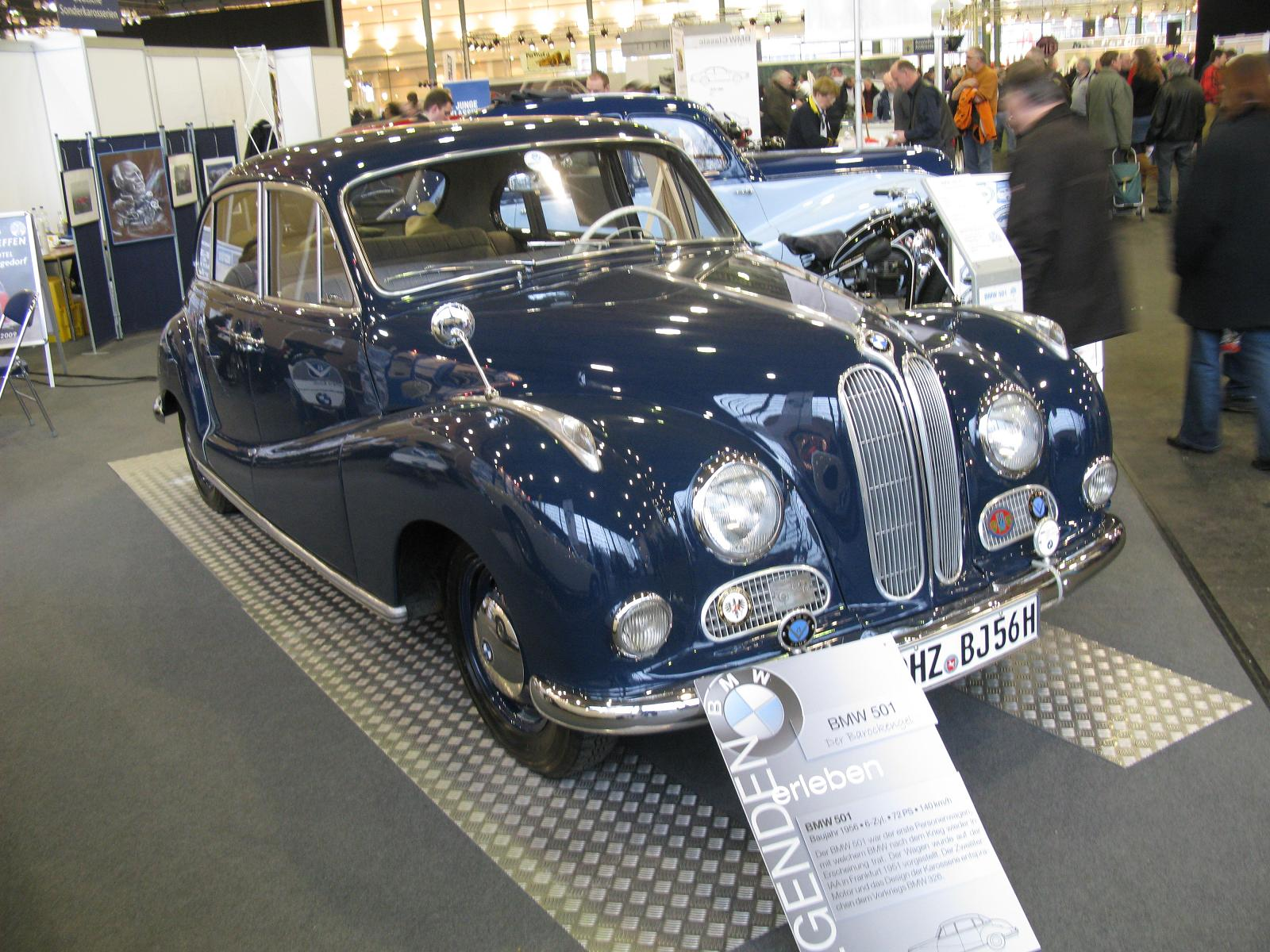
- BMW 501- the first car to use the M337

Overview
- Production: 1952-1958

Layout
- Configuration: Straight-6
- Displacement: 2.0–2.1 L (122–128 cu in)
- Cylinder block material: Cast iron
- Cylinder head material: Cast iron
- Valvetrain: OHV

Combustion
- Fuel type: Petrol

Chronology
- Predecessor: BMW M78

The BMW M337 is a straight-6 OHV petrol engine installed at a slanted angle which was produced in three variants (M337/1, M337/2 and M337/3) from 1952-1958. Built to power BMW's first new car after World War II, the M337 engine was a replacement for the BMW M78.

== Design ==
Compared with its M78 predecessor, the M337 features a revised cylinder head, a new inlet manifold and a reinforced crankshaft with bigger, more modern bearings. As per the M78, the M337 has an iron engine block, an iron cylinder head and overhead valves with two valves per cylinder.

== Versions ==
Model	Displacement	Power	Torque	Year
M337/1	1,971 cc (120.3 cu in)	48 kW (65 PS; 64 hp) at 4,400 rpm	129 N⋅m (95 lb⋅ft) at 2,000 rpm	1952-1954
M337/2	1,971 cc (120.3 cu in)	54 kW (73 PS; 72 hp) at 4,400 rpm	130 N⋅m (96 lb⋅ft) at 2,500 rpm	1954-1955
M337/3	2,077 cc (126.7 cu in)	54 kW (73 PS; 72 hp) at 4,400 rpm	135 N⋅m (100 lb⋅ft) at 2,500 rpm	1955-1958

=== M337/1 ===
The first version of the M337 engine has a displacement of 120.3 cu in (1,971 cc). It produces 48 kW (65 PS) at 4,400 rpm and 129 N⋅m (95 lb⋅ft) at 2,000 rpm.

Applications:

- 1952-1954 501

=== M337/2 ===
In 1954, a revised engine was released which produced 54 kW (73 PS) at 4,400 rpm and 130 N⋅m (96 lb⋅ft) at 2,500 rpm. The compression ratio for this engine is 6.8:1.

Applications:

- 1954-1955 501A
- 1954-1955 501B

=== M337/3 ===
The final version of the M337 had an increase in bore of 2 mm (0.079 in), which increased displacement to 2,077 cc (126.7 cu in). The compression ratio was also increased to 7.0:1. Despite these changes the M337/3 produced no more power than the previous version. However torque increased to 135 N⋅m (100 lb⋅ft) at 2,500 rpm.

Applications:

- 1955-1958 501/3
