= Bristol 406 Zagato =

British-Italian sports car built by Zagato

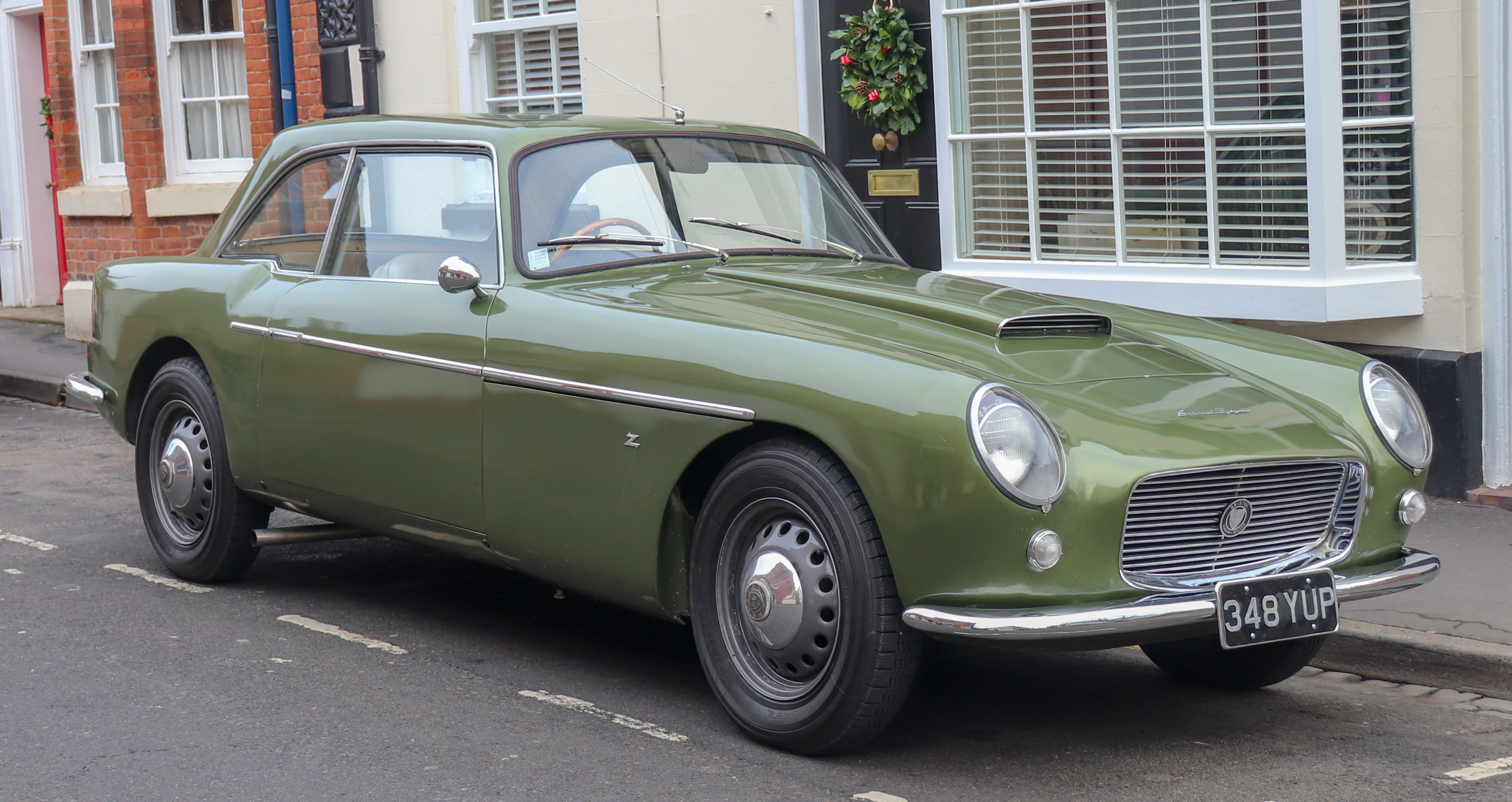

Overview
- Manufacturer: Bristol Cars (then Bristol Aeroplane Co.)
- Production: 1959–1960

Body and chassis
- Class: Sports car (S)
- Body style: 2-door Saloon
- Layout: FR
- Related: Bristol 406

Powertrain
- Engine: 2,216 cc (135.2 cu in) OHV I6
- Transmission: 4-speed overdrive manual

Dimensions
- Wheelbase: 2,896 mm (114.0 in)
- Length: 4,700 mm (185.0 in)
- Width: 1,600 mm (63.0 in)
- Curb weight: 1,120 kg (2,469 lb)

Chronology
- Successor: Bristol 407 GTZ Zagato

The Bristol 406 Zagato is a British-Italian sports car based on the Bristol 406 Saloon, with a body designed and built by Zagato. It was commissioned by Bristol dealer Tony Crook and only a small number were built. It is lighter, smaller, and faster than the factory-bodied base car. Some older Bristol chassis later received similar Zagato bodies. Today, the 406 Zagato is considered one of the most desirable classic Bristols.

== History ==
Bristol Cars, the automotive division of the Bristol Aeroplane Company, was established after the end of World War II and began producing luxury cars based on BMW technology in 1946. The chassis and engines were derived from pre-war BMW Types 326, 327, and 328. These design plans were reportedly brought to Britain as reparations during the war, although others doubt this narrative. Prior to the outbreak of WWII, HJ "Aldy" Aldington of the AFN company, builder of Frazer Nash cars, had secured both the sales rights for the six-cylinder range of BMWs for the UK, and the right for AFN to manufacture cars and components based on these designs in the UK. As the end of hostilities neared, AFN began to plan resuming civilian production of cars, while the Bristol Aeroplane Company examined the building of automobiles as a way to keep the company busy after their wartime contracts ended, and established Bristol Cars to that end. Shortly after the war, Aldy Aldington and his brother Don traveled to Germany, returning with a Mille Miglia 328 and blueprints for many of BMW's pre-war designs. In July 1945, Bristol Cars acquired AFN, and the BMW licenses were transferred to the new owner. The new company also benefited from the addition of former BMW engineer Fritz Fiedler. Bristol Cars began producing an English version of BMW's M328 straight-six, both to use in their own cars and to supply to Frazer Nash for their post-war models.

The debut 400 model, featuring bodywork based on a BMW coupé, (Note: Bristol's designer Dudley Hobbs based the design of the 400's body on a body that Peter Schimanowski had designed for the BMW 327 in 1938 and that the Darmstadt-based Autenrieth body plant had built. Cf. Classic Cars Special: English classic cars, p. 6 ff.) was followed by the Touring-bodied 401, 402, and 403 models, which are treated as a single-model family in most literature. In 1953, the third generation of Bristol cars emerged, with the two-door 404, followed by the four-door 405 a year later. These models still retained BMW designs in their engineering. However, production levels in the mid-1950s were only about half of what they had been in the early years. During the autumn of 1958, Bristol introduced the fourth-generation model, the four-seat 406 Saloon. This model represented a departure from the brand's initial focus on sportiness. It was larger, heavier, and more luxurious than earlier Bristol's. However, these changes resulted in a loss of the typical agility associated with Bristol cars, and despite having a larger engine, the 406 Saloon was slower than its predecessors. As a result, it was sometimes perceived as underpowered.

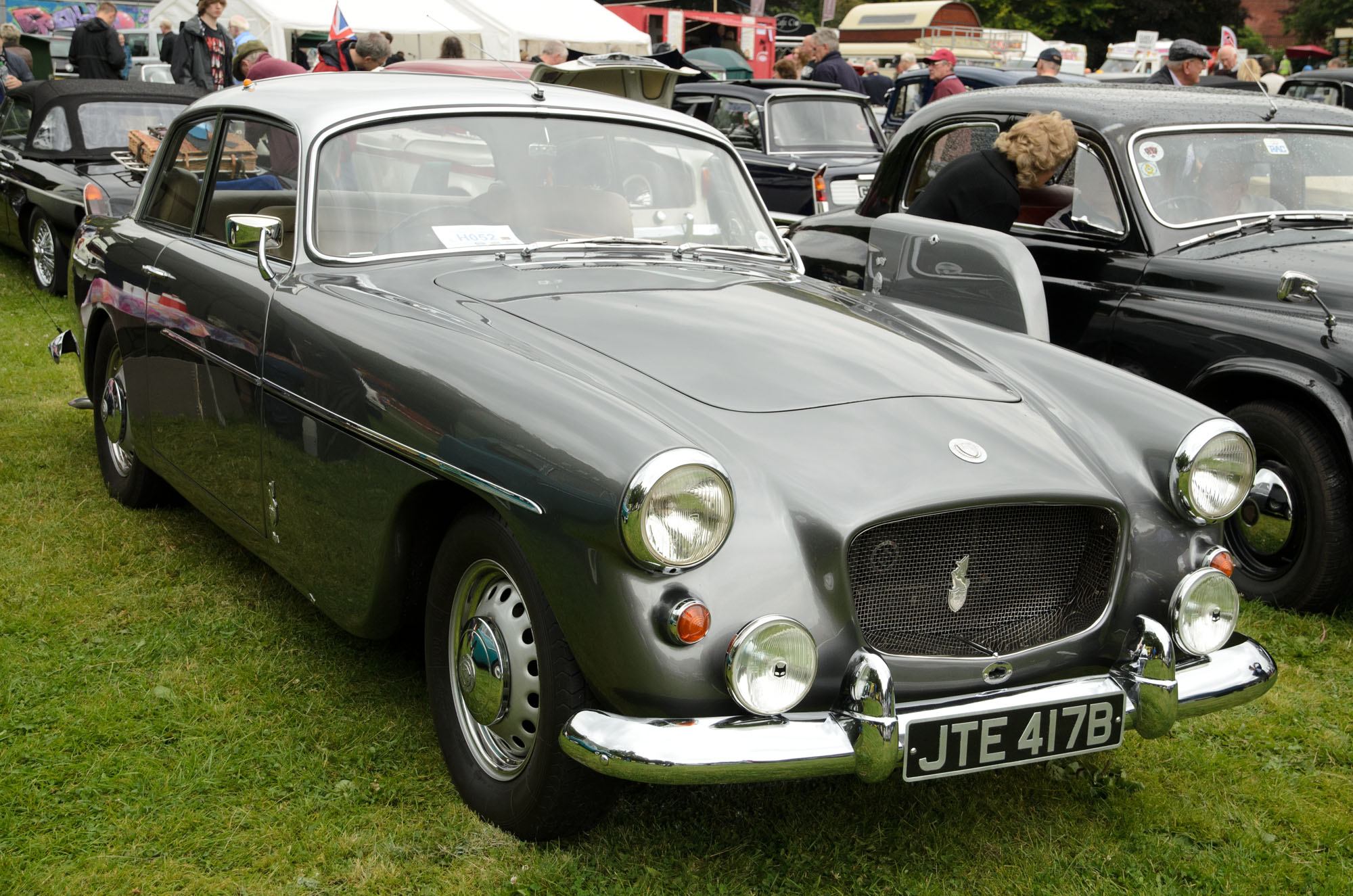
A standard 1958 Bristol 406 Saloon

Bristol had plans to create a shorter and faster two-seater version of the 406 Saloon at their factory, with a prototype built in 1958, but full-scale production was abandoned due to cost considerations and uncertain prospects for the company. The following spring, Tony Crook, a Bristol Cars board of directors member and the brand's largest dealer, revived the idea of a special sport model based on the 406. This led to the development of the 406 Zagato as an independent project by Anthony Crook Motors, rather than an official Bristol Cars model. The 406 Zagato was intended to return Bristol to its origins: according to Crook it was designed for drivers who were prepared to sacrifice comfort and space for the sake of sporting performance. In Crook's estimation, the key aspect was a light and compact body. He commissioned Italian Carrozzeria Zagato, known for its expertise in lightweight construction and whose British general importer Crook had been for years, to design and build it. Additionally, Abarth was tasked with increasing the engine’s power.

The 406 Zagato prototype was unveiled exactly one year after the introduction of the 406 Saloon. It debuted at the Earls Motor Show in London from October 21–31, 1959. The prototype was displayed either on the Bristol Cars, Anthony Crook Motors, or Zagato stand, depending on the source. Regular production began in the fall of 1959, ending a year later. Notably, the Bristol 406 was exclusively available through Anthony Crook Motors—other Bristol dealers could not access it.

The 406 Zagato did not achieve significant success. Of the production goal of ten vehicles, only six were produced, and even those proved difficult to sell. Despite its limited commercial success, this was the beginning of a longstanding collaboration between Bristol and Zagato: In 1960, a compact sports car with 406 technology and a hatchback body from Zagato (406S Zagato) was produced, followed in 1961 by a similarly designed car based on the Bristol 407, incorporating a V8 engine from Chrysler (407 GTZ Zagato). While these two models remained one-offs creations. Bristol went on to sell a total of about 90 units of the 412 Targa coupe and its successor, the Beaufighter, whose body was designed by Giuseppe Mittino for Zagato, from 1975 to 1993.

== Naming ==
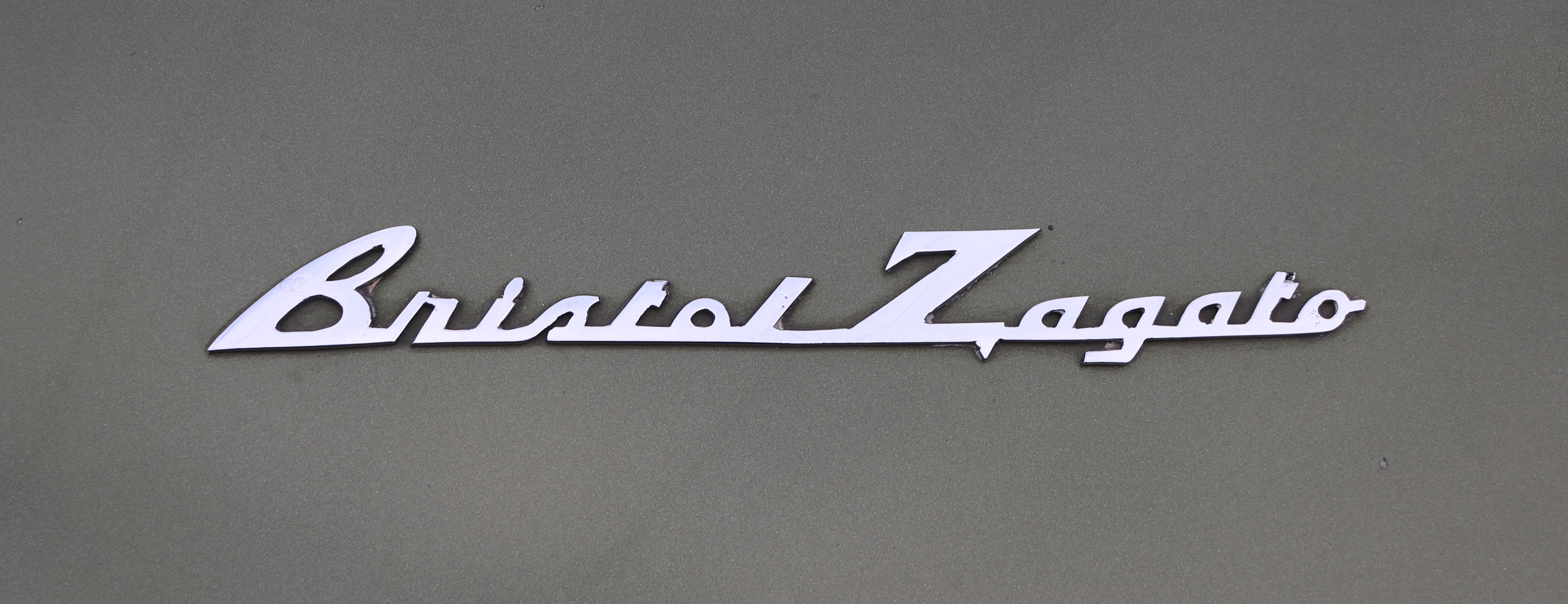
Bristol-Zagato badge

The four-seater which in 1958 took over the role of Bristol Cars' main model, previously filled by the Bristol 405, is commonly known as the 406 Saloon. The lightweight special edition model with Italian bodywork was marketed as the 406 Zagato. In more recent literature, the designations 406 Z, 406 GTZ, or 406 GT Zagato (not used in 1959) are also sometimes found.

== Features ==
=== Chassis and suspension ===
The 406 Zagato is built on a steel box frame with longitudinal members and cross members, which shares the construction and dimensions with the regular 406 Saloon. The frame traces its basic features back to the chassis of the 1936 BMW 326. The front suspension is independent, with upper wishbones and a lower transverse leaf spring. At the rear, the car is equipped with a rigid axle featuring a Watt's linkage and a trailing arm, torsion bar springs with suspension levers, and self-designed shock absorbers. Additionally, the car decelerates with four Dunlop disc brakes.

=== Engine and transmission ===
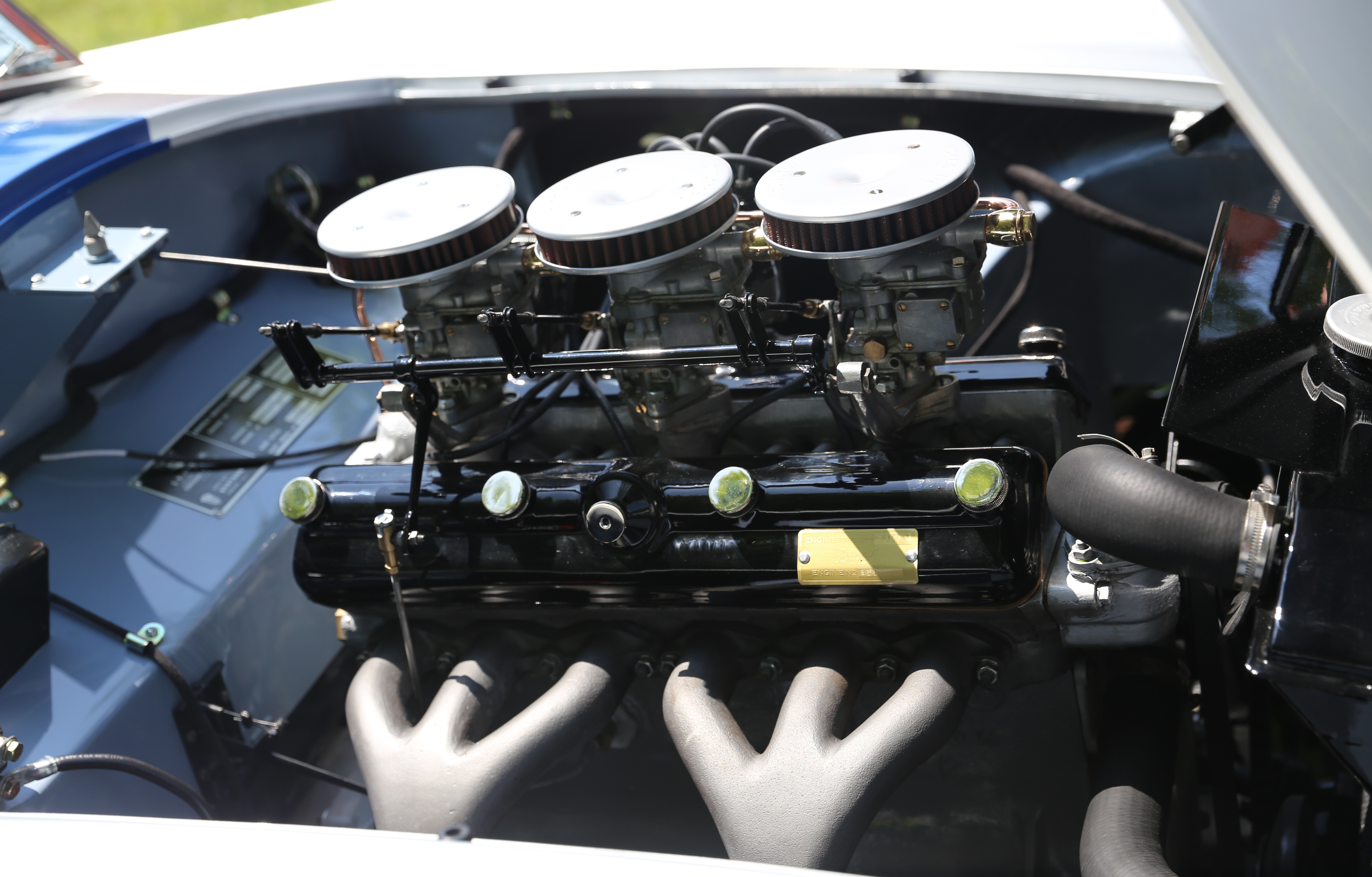
Bristol's six-cylinder

All 406 Zagato models are powered by Bristol's inline six-cylinder petrol engine. The 2.2-litre (2,216 cc; 135.2 cu in) version used here, with a bore × stroke of 68.69 mm × 99.64 mm (2.70 in × 3.92 in), is a further development of the engine already installed in the 400, which goes back to the 1938 BMW M328 design. While the Bristol engine shares its key features with the BMW engine, Bristol's version is designed in inches rather than metric dimensions, and some materials are used differently. The engine has hemispherical combustion chambers, with two inclined overhead valves per cylinder. The intake valves are operated by a camshaft in the cylinder block via tappets, pushrods, and shaft-mounted rocker arms. Another set of pushrods goes across the cylinder head to a second rocker shaft to operate the exhaust valves. The fuel mixture is delivered by three 32 PBI/7 Solex downdraft carburetors.

In the 406 Zagato, the engine was available with two different power ratings:

- Individual cars, including the prototype publicly exhibited in October 1959, are equipped with the basic Type 110 version of the engine, which was also fitted to all 406 Saloons. It produces 105 bhp (78 kW; 105 hp), with a torque of 175 N⋅m (129 lb⋅ft) at 4700 revolutions per minute.
- Most 406 Zagatos feature a more powerful Type 110S version of the six-cylinder engine, not offered in the 406 Saloon. It delivers a maximum output of 130 bhp (97 kW; 132 PS) with the same displacement. Maximum torque is slightly lower than in the base version at 166 N⋅m (122 lb⋅ft) but at a lower rpm of 3750. The increase in power was achieved by raising compression to 9.0:1, and adding a modified camshaft and new exhaust system, including a manifold from Abarth.

Engine power is transmitted to the rear axle via a four-speed manual transmission with overdrive, and a propeller shaft. The first gear of the Bristol-built transmission is not synchronized. The Laycock de Normanville overdrive, which has been standard on all Bristols since the 405, can be engaged in fourth gear and disengages automatically when downshifting.

=== Bodywork ===
The body of the 406 Zagato is independent. It has neither stylistic nor technical references to the body of the 406 Saloon designed by Dudley Hobbs and Dennis Sevier.

==== Design ====
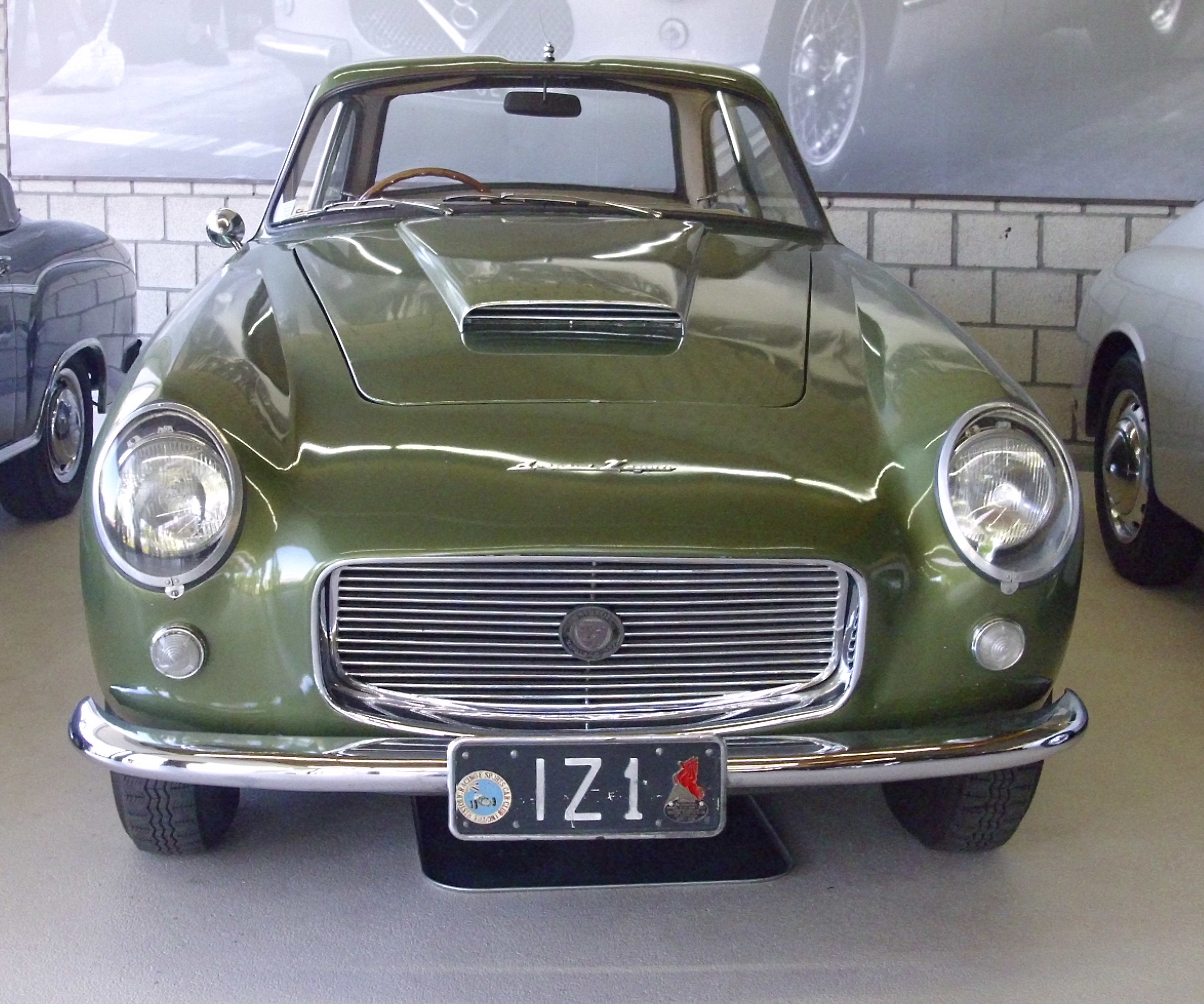
Front end with echoes of Lancia

The design of the notchback body can be traced back to Gianni Zagato, the son of the company's founder, Ugo Zagato. The front end of the car features style elements inspired by the Lancia Flaminia Sport, another car designed and built by Zagato. The radiator grille is directly borrowed from Lancia and, on individual cars even features Lancia's crest encircled by the Bristol Cars emblem. The roof structure follows the trapezoidal shape that gained popularity in Europe in the late 1950s. With the horizontal roofline and the C-pillar set well back, Zagato implemented a Tony Crook requirement that the car had to have four full-size seats for adults. However, the interior of the Zagato is tighter than that of the 406 Saloon. The roof has the typical Zagato bulges called double bubbles in the rear. On the 1959 prototype and the car produced thereafter, the roof is slightly lower than on the following four cars. The doors are frameless. The front headlights are recessed into the fenders and covered with Plexiglas. Due to the tall engine, a cowl is required in the middle of the hood, which also serves as an air intake. A lengthwise body detail runs from just behind the front tyre to just ahead of the rear, rising toward the back of the bar. The rear overhang is shorter than that of the standard 406. Consistent with Bristol's tradition, the spare wheel is vertically housed in one of the front fenders in an externally accessible compartment located between the front wheel and the A-pillar. On the other side of the vehicle, a similar compartment accommodates the battery.

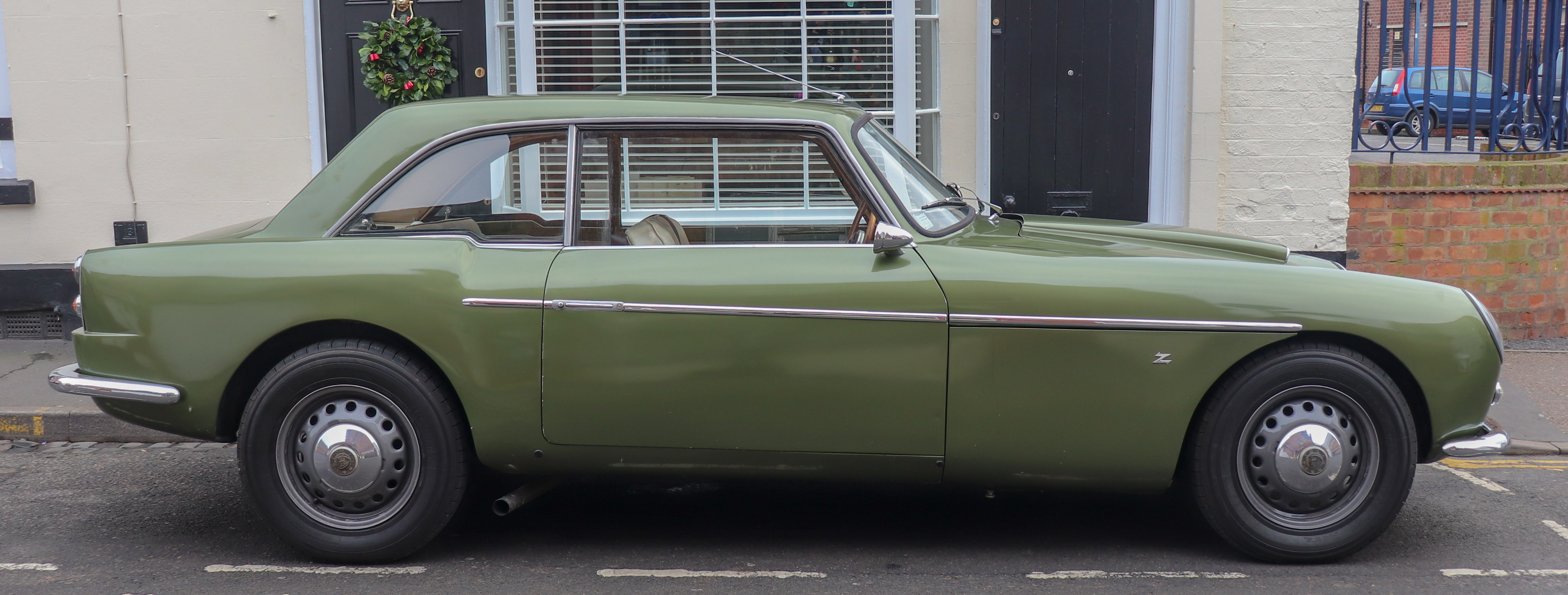
Lateral line with crease

Decorative elements on the 406 Zagato vary from vehicle to vehicle, including the radiator grille and the side trim. On certain cars, the side trim extends horizontally to the rear wheel cutout or onto the rear fender, while on others, it may feature a Z-shaped bend, or be missing entirely. Additionally, some cars have three horizontal trim strips on the C-pillar, while others do not.

The 406 Zagato's body design has received mixed reviews. Some sources consider it "eccentric", while others are undecided whether it is a "charismatic classic or confused catastrophe."

==== Lightweight Design ====
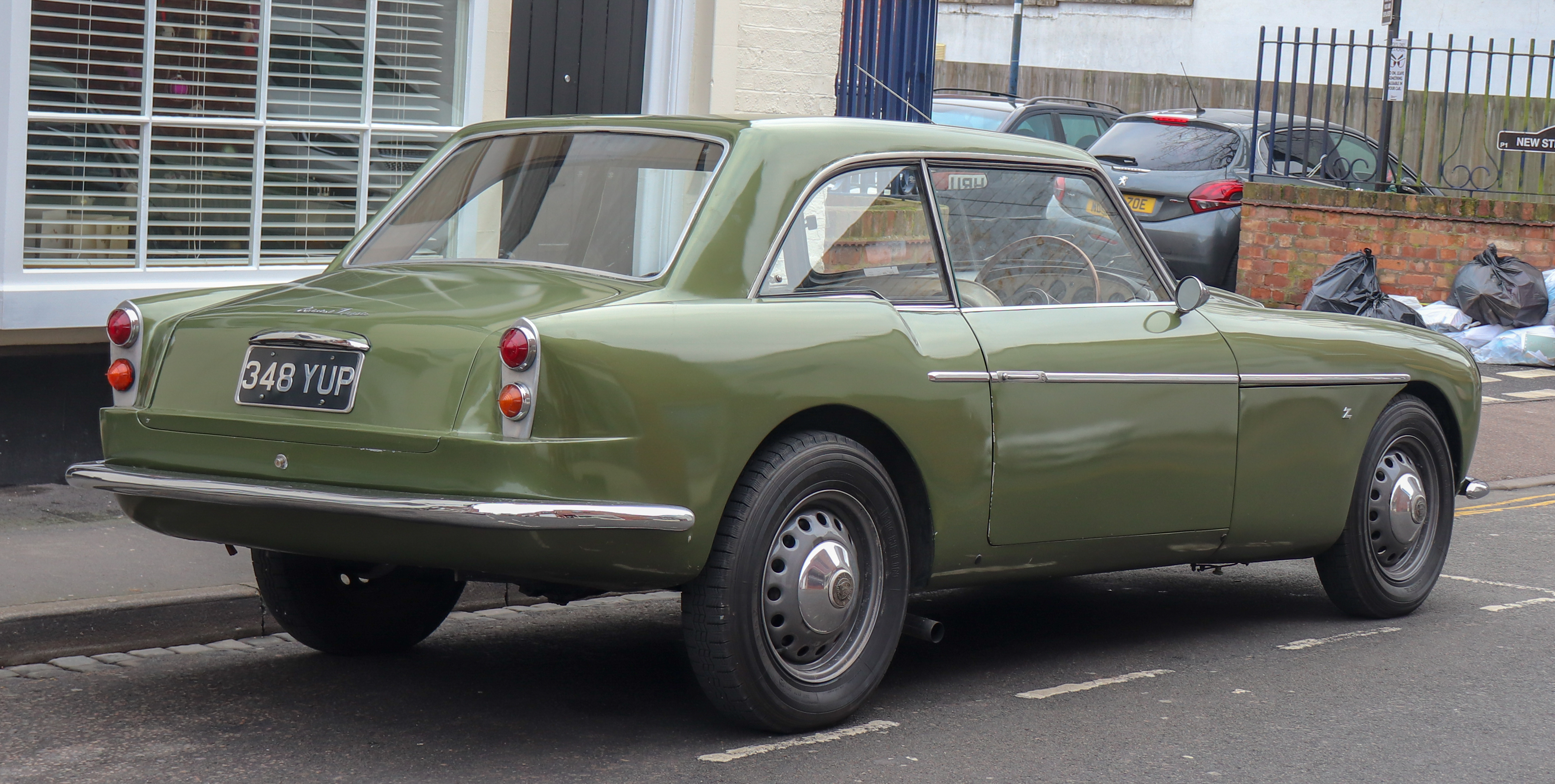
Short tail

Zagato consistently focused on lightweight construction throughout the design of the 406 Zagato. In contrast to the heavy steel substructure of the 406 Saloon produced by the London coachbuilder Jones Brothers. (Note: The 406 Saloon was the first Bristol so constructed; on all earlier models, the body panels were supported by an ash frame. S. Dieter Günther: Bristol Cream. It's all in the engine: The Bristol models 406 and 407, in: Oldtimer Markt special issue 14 (“Gran Turismo: The Great Travel Coupés”), 1994, p. 33.) Zagato opted for a lightweight frame made of thin steel tubes to which the body panels made of aluminum sheets were attached. The shorter body also contributed to weight reduction. In the interior, Zagato took a minimalistic approach, omitting decorative elements. For example, unlike the factory model, the instrument panel in the 406 Saloon, is not covered with walnut wood; instead, it is made of thin sheet aluminum painted to match the color of the seat covers. However, it is worth noting that at least one car features the comfortable armchairs found in the 406 Saloon.

==== Faults ====
The body of the 406 Zagato exhibits certain defects, such as the rear wheel arches being too small. As a result, when encountering bumps on the road, the tires often meet the top of the wheel arches during impacts. Crook acknowledged this 40 years after production ceased and admitted that the build quality of the Zagato bodies did not meet the expected standards. He mentioned that in many instances, his mechanics had to make adjustments to address issues such as fits, gaps, and finishes.

=== Dimensions, weight, and performance ===
With an unchanged chassis, the Bristol 406 Zagato is 280 mm (11.0 in) shorter than the 406 Saloon. In terms of weight, the 406 Zagato weighs approximately 1,100 kg (2,425 lb), which is significantly lighter compared to the standard model's 1,350 kg (2,976 lb), and close to that of the 1946 Bristol 400. According to contemporary test drives, the 406 Zagato equipped with the more powerful 110S engine achieved a top speed of 122 mph (196 km/h). The 406 Saloon could only reach 102 mph (164 km/h).

== Production process ==
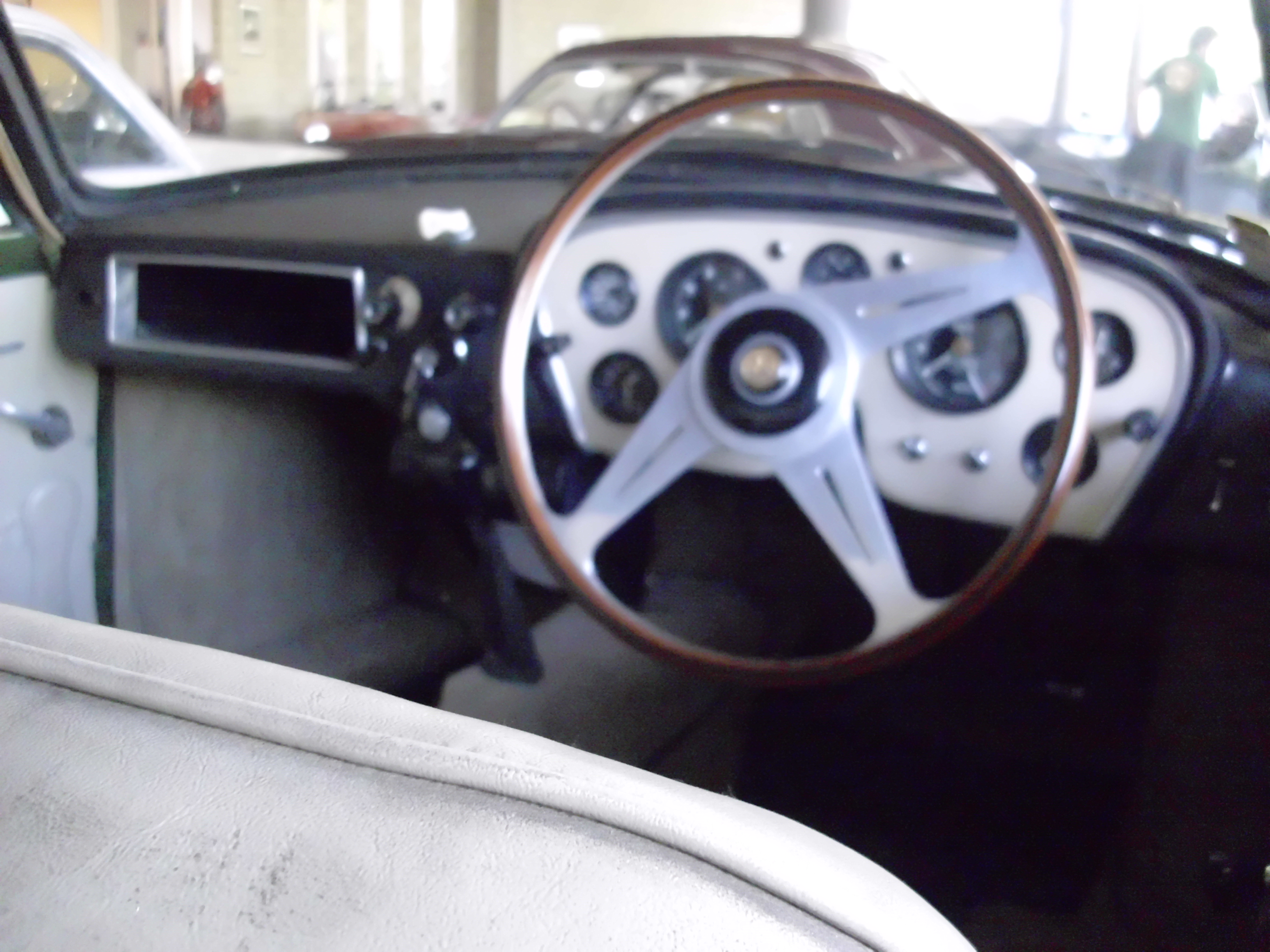
interior (Note: The picture shows a 2.0-litre version in an Arnolt-Bristol.)

The production process for the cars involved multiple locations. The chassis were manufactured at the Bristol plant in Filton. After completion, the chassis was trucked to Zagato's facility in Milan, where Italian mechanics would fit the hand-built bodies to the chassis and do final assembly of the vehicles. Tony Crook assigned two employees from his workshop to supervise the work at Zagato's factory and ensure compliance with Bristol's quality requirements. The finished cars were returned to Great Britain "on their own wheels," where they underwent additional reworking and final adjustments at Crook's workshop in Hersham in Surrey.

== Production and Prices ==
Based on various sources, it is evident that production of the Bristol 406 Zagato did not reach the originally planned number of ten cars. It is widely agreed that only six Bristol 406 Zagato vehicles were actually produced. While some sources indicate a production run of seven cars, that includes the short-wheelbase 406 S Zagato as a separate model.

Anthony Crook Motors offered the Bristol 406 Zagato for sale in late 1959 for £4,792 (vehicle price £3,380 plus £1412 purchase tax), making it £550 more expensive than a regular factory-bodied 406 Saloon (£4,244 including tax). The price of a 406 Zagato was the equivalent of seven Triumph Heralds or nine Mini (£500).

Bristol 406 Zagato’s slow sales led to discounted pricing, with the final new car at a substantial discount in October 1961 for £3,500 including tax. A used 406 Zagato with 6,000 miles was listed for £2,800 at the same time.

Of the original six 406 Zagato, four or five cars are believed to still exist today, depending on the source. Unfortunately, the third car produced, which featured a higher roof - was involved in a serious road accident in the 20th century. Tony Crook had the car dismantled; the usable components were used as spare parts.

== The Bristol 406 Zagato as a classic ==
The Bristol 406 Zagato is regarded as one of the brand's rarest classics. In recent auctions where it appeared, it typically receives the highest sale prices of any Bristol. In the early 21st century, Zagato was trading for 20 to 30 times the price of a new car. A 1960-built car sold for £169,500 (€187,390) in fully restored condition in 2014.

== Related Models ==
=== Zagato's bodies for older Bristol chassis ===
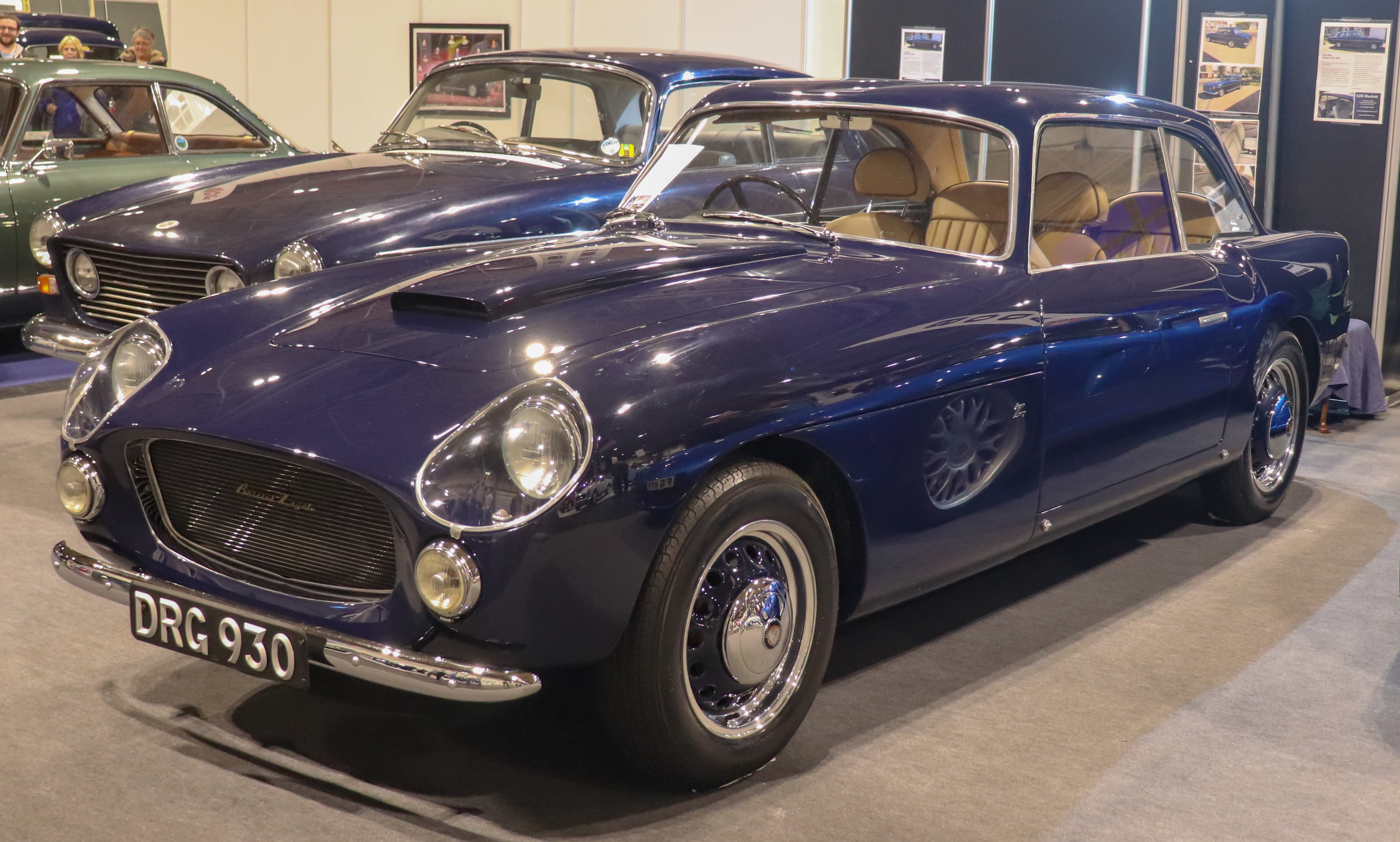
Upgrade model: 406 Zagato body on the chassis of a 1949 Bristol 400 (VIN 400-1-568)

Since Anthony Crook Motors had only managed to sell six out of the ten 406 Zagato vehicles produced in Italy according to the contract, a surplus of bodies remained. To make use of these surplus bodies, Crook made the decision to retrofit them onto older Bristol chassis starting in 1961. By repurposing the surplus bodies in this manner, Crook aimed to utilize the available resources and give new life to the remaining Zagato bodies. In a process known in the UK as upgrading, several Bristol 400 and 401 chassis were retrofitted with the remaining 406 Zagato-style bodies, which had been stylistically reworked in detail in Crook's workshop. None of the upgraded cars left Crook's workshop with a 2.2-litre Type 110 or Type 110S engine; rather, they all had the 2.0-litre Type 85 engines they were equipped with originally. At least one of these cars was fitted with a Type 110 engine at the owner’s request.

Like the regular 406 Zagatos, these upgrades were projects of Anthony Crook Motors; there was no direct link to Bristol Cars. Crook offered the conversions from the summer of 1961 at a third of the price of an original 406 Zagato (£1,550). The exact number of these hybrid models produced is unknown, but Crook stated in 2001 that the demand had been good. Brand documentation suggests "at least three" cars were reworked in this way. Based on the 1949 chassis number 400-1-568, one of these mixed models was found in disrepair in Devon in 2013. As a so-called barn find, the car was auctioned unrestored for £29,000 in the same year. Since then, the car has been fully restored and is repeatedly shown at exhibitions.

=== Bristol 406 S Zagato ===
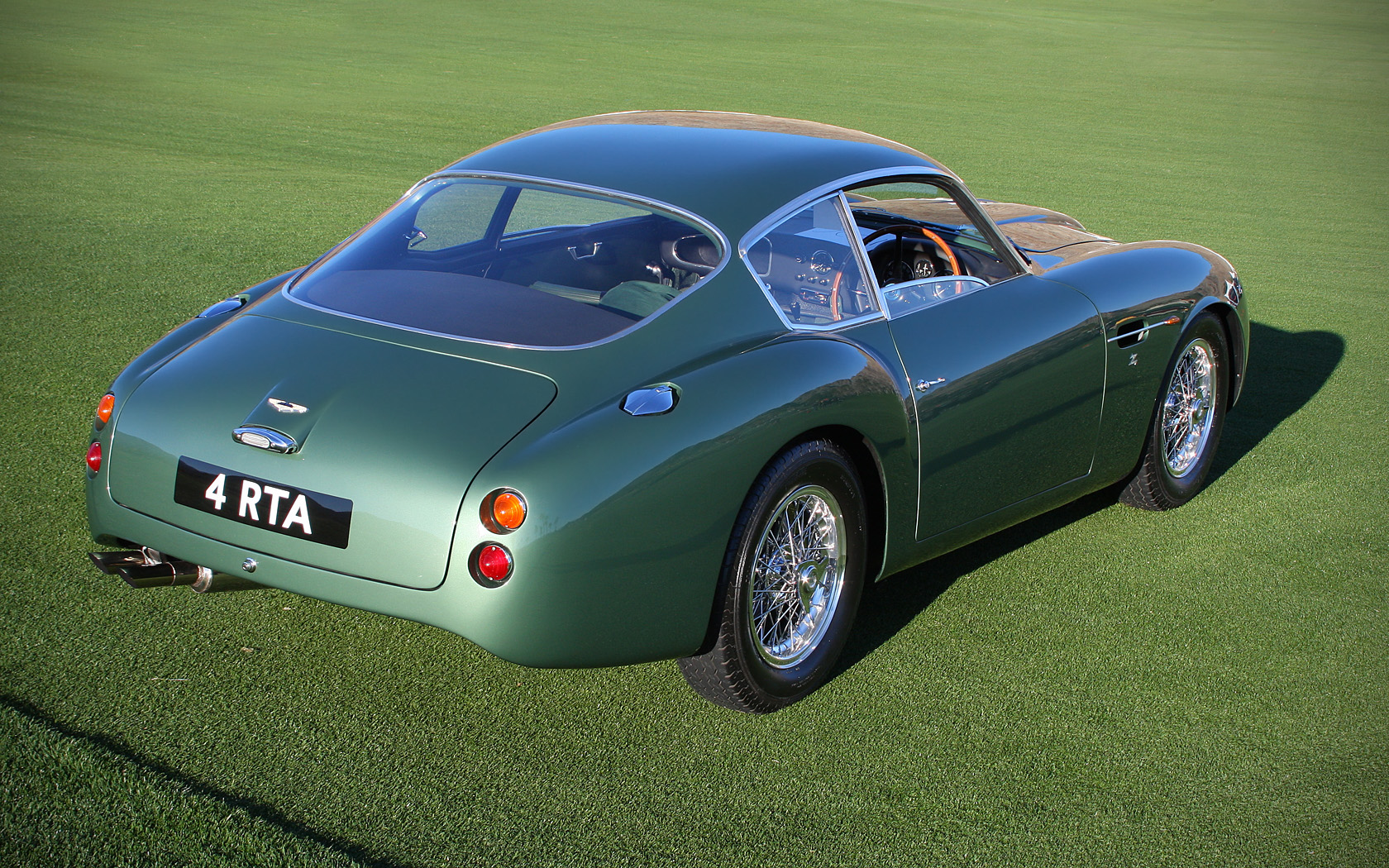
Based on the Bristol 406 S Zagato: Aston Martin DB 4 GT Zagato

The 406 S Zagato is a stylistically distinct vehicle characterized by its shorter wheelbase. The "S" suffix (for "short") refers to this special feature. The two-seater, designated factory 406S-P2, is a one-off built in 1960 at Zagato in Milan on behalf of Anthony Crook Motors. It is based on a slightly lengthened Bristol 404 chassis. With a wheelbase of 2,743 mm (108.0 in), the 406 S Zagato lies between the short 404 (2,438 millimetres or 96.0 inches) and the regular 406 Saloon and 406 Zagato (2,896 millimetres or 114.0 inches). This chassis is the same as that of the prototype 406S-P1 produced in 1958. The aluminum body of the 406 S Zagato features soft curves and a semi-hatchback. The rear fenders are rounded, and a panoramic rear window is taken from a small-production Zagato-bodied Lancia. The 406 S Zagato is equipped with the 130 bhp (97 kW; 132 PS) Type-110S engine that was also used in the longer 406 Zagato. This particular car was utilized by Tony Crook’s family for several years and still existed at the beginning of the 21st century.

The design of the 406 S Zagato body was later adapted, with slight modifications, for the Aston Martin DB4 GT Zagato. The Bristol 407 GTZ Zagato, introduced in 1961, also received a similar, although significantly longer, body design.

== Specifications ==
Bristol 406 Zagato
	2.2-Litre Type 110	2.2-Litre Type 110 S
Engine:	Six-cylinder in-line petrol engine	
Engine displacement:	2,216 cc (135.2 cu in)	
Bore × Stroke:	68.69 mm × 99.64 mm (2.70 in × 3.92 in)	
Performance:	105 bhp (78 kW; 106 PS)	130 bhp (97 kW; 132 PS)
Max. torque:	177 N⋅m (130.5 lb⋅ft) at 4700 rpm	165 N⋅m (121.7 lb⋅ft) at 3750 rpm
Compression ratio:	8.5:1	9.0:1
Mixture preparation:	3 × Solex Type 32 PBI/7 downdraft carburettors	
Valvetrain:	One chain-driven cam-in-block; pushrods to intake rocker shaft Pushrods from intake rocker shaft to exhaust rocker shaft. Tappets and 2 valves per cylinder	
Cooling:	Water	
Transmission:	4-speed manual transmission, gears 2 to 4 synchronized, overdrive	
Front suspension:	Upper wishbone and lower transverse leaf spring	
Rear suspension:	Rigid axle, guided at the bottom by the support levers of the torsion bar springs via short connecting rods, above by a trailing arm and laterally by a Watt linkage	
Brakes:	front and rear disc brakes	
Chassis:	Tubular frame	
Body:	Aluminum on tubular support frame	
Wheelbase:	2,896 mm (114.0 in)	
Dimensions (Length × Width × Height):	4,700 mm × 1,600 mm × 1,397 mm (185.0 in × 63.0 in × 55.0 in)	
Curb weight:	1,120 kg (2,469 lb)	
Top speed:	approx. 170 km/h (106 mph)	approx. 196 km/h (122 mph)
