= Bristol 403 =

Overview
- Manufacturer: Bristol Cars (then Bristol Aeroplane Co.)
- Production: 1953–1955; 287 units
- Assembly: United Kingdom: Filton

Body and chassis
- Body style: 2-door coupé
- Layout: FR layout

Powertrain
- Engine: 1971 cc OHV I6
- Transmission: 4-speed manual

Dimensions
- Length: 15 ft 11.5 in (4,864 mm)
- Width: 5 ft 7 in (1,702 mm)
- Curb weight: 2,788 lb (1,265 kg)

Chronology
- Predecessor: Bristol 401
- Successor: Bristol 404 and 405

The Bristol 403 is a luxury car which was produced from 1953 to 1955 by British manufacturer Bristol Aeroplane Co. (whose car division later became Bristol Cars). The 403 was the third of the eventual five series of Bristols powered by the BMW-derived pushrod straight-six engine. It replaced the Bristol 401 and 402 in 1953 and continued in production for two years.

It retained much the same styling as the 401, but featured many mechanical improvements compared to that model. The 1971 cc six-cylinder engine was modified through the use of bigger valves and larger main bearings with a diameter of 54 mm as against 51 mm on the 400 and 401, which increased the power output to 100 hp (75 kW) as against 85 hp (63 kW) on the 401. The acceleration was markedly improved: the 403 could reach 60 miles per hour (97 km/h) in 13.4 seconds as against 16.4 seconds for the 401. The 403 had top speed of 104 miles per hour (167 km/h).

To cope with this increased power, an anti-roll bar was fitted on the front suspension and improved drum brakes known as "Alfins" (Aluminum finned) were fitted. Early models had them on all wheels, but Bristol thought the car was over-braked and they were thus restricted to the front wheels on later 403s.

The 403 was the last Bristol to feature a BMW-style radiator grille. It is also noteworthy for having two extra headlamps at the side, almost pre-dating the adoption of the four-headlamp layout in larger cars (Bristol themselves adopted it with the 411 in the late 1960s).

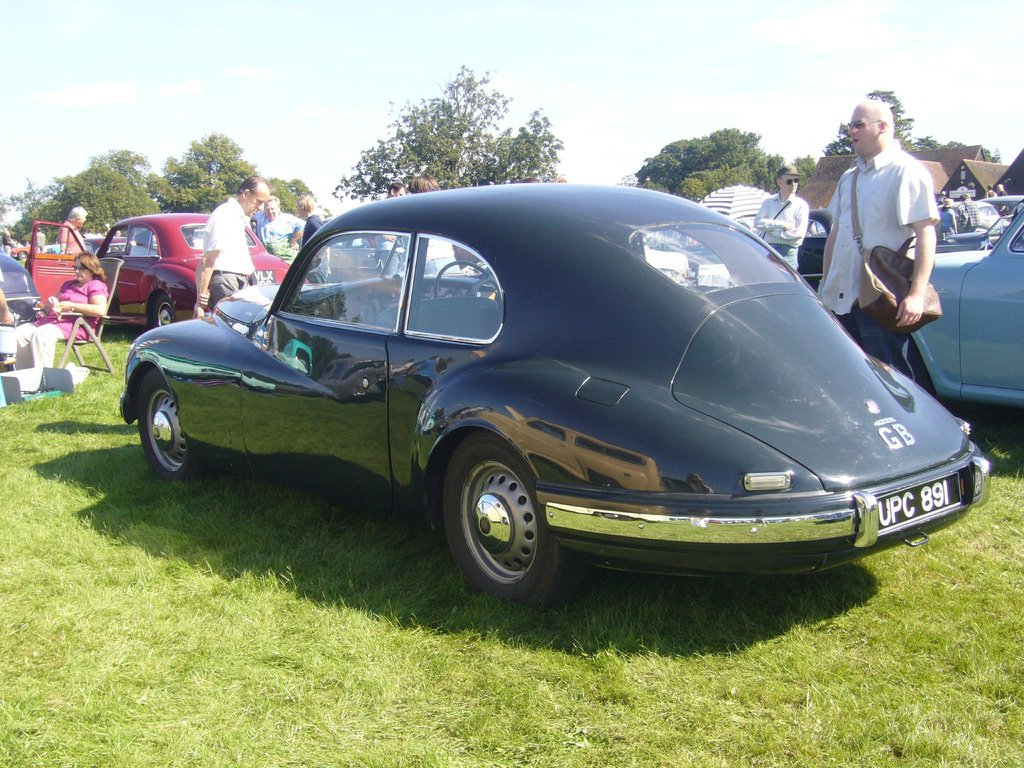
Bristol 403 (rear view)

Engine
