= BMW 327 =

BMW/EMW 327
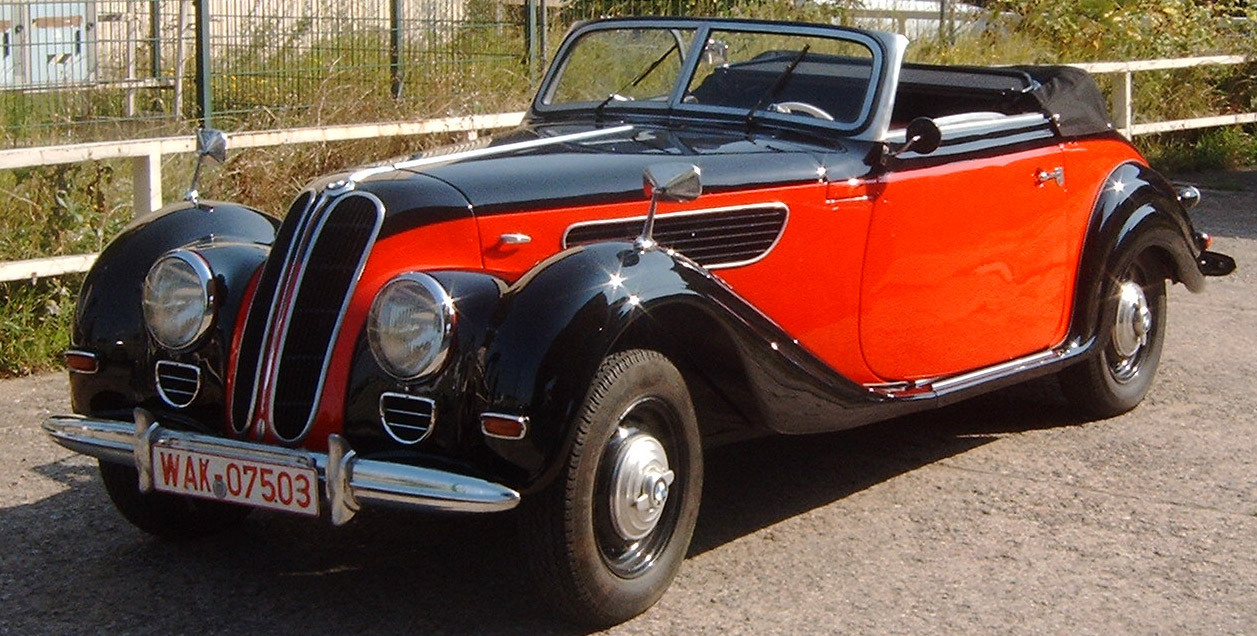

Overview
- Manufacturer: Bayerische Motoren Werke AG (BMW); Sowjetische AG Maschinenbau Awtowelo; Eisenacher Motorenwerk
- Production: 1937–1941; 1945–1955
- Assembly: Eisenach, Germany (1937–1941); Soviet occupation zone in Germany (1945–1949); East Germany (1949–1955)
- Designer: Peter Szymanowski

Body and chassis
- Class: Grand tourer
- Body style: 2-door coupé 2-door cabriolet
- Layout: FR layout
- Related: BMW 326; BMW 328; Bristol 400

Powertrain
- Engine: 1971 cc M78 I6 (327); 1971 cc M328 I6 (327/28)
- Transmission: 4 speed manual

Dimensions
- Wheelbase: 2,750 mm (108 in)
- Length: 4,500 mm (180 in)
- Width: 1,600 mm (63 in)
- Height: 1,430 mm (56 in)
- Curb weight: 1,100 kg (2,400 lb) (measurements approximate)

The BMW 327 is a medium-sized touring coupé produced by BMW between 1937 and 1941, and again produced after 1945. It sat on a shortened version of the BMW 326 chassis.

== Launch ==
The first 327, launched in 1937, was a cabriolet. In 1938, this was joined by a fixed head coupé version. The car was shorter and lower than its sedan counterpart, but shared the famous BMW grille and a streamlined form representative of the more progressive designs of the 1930s.

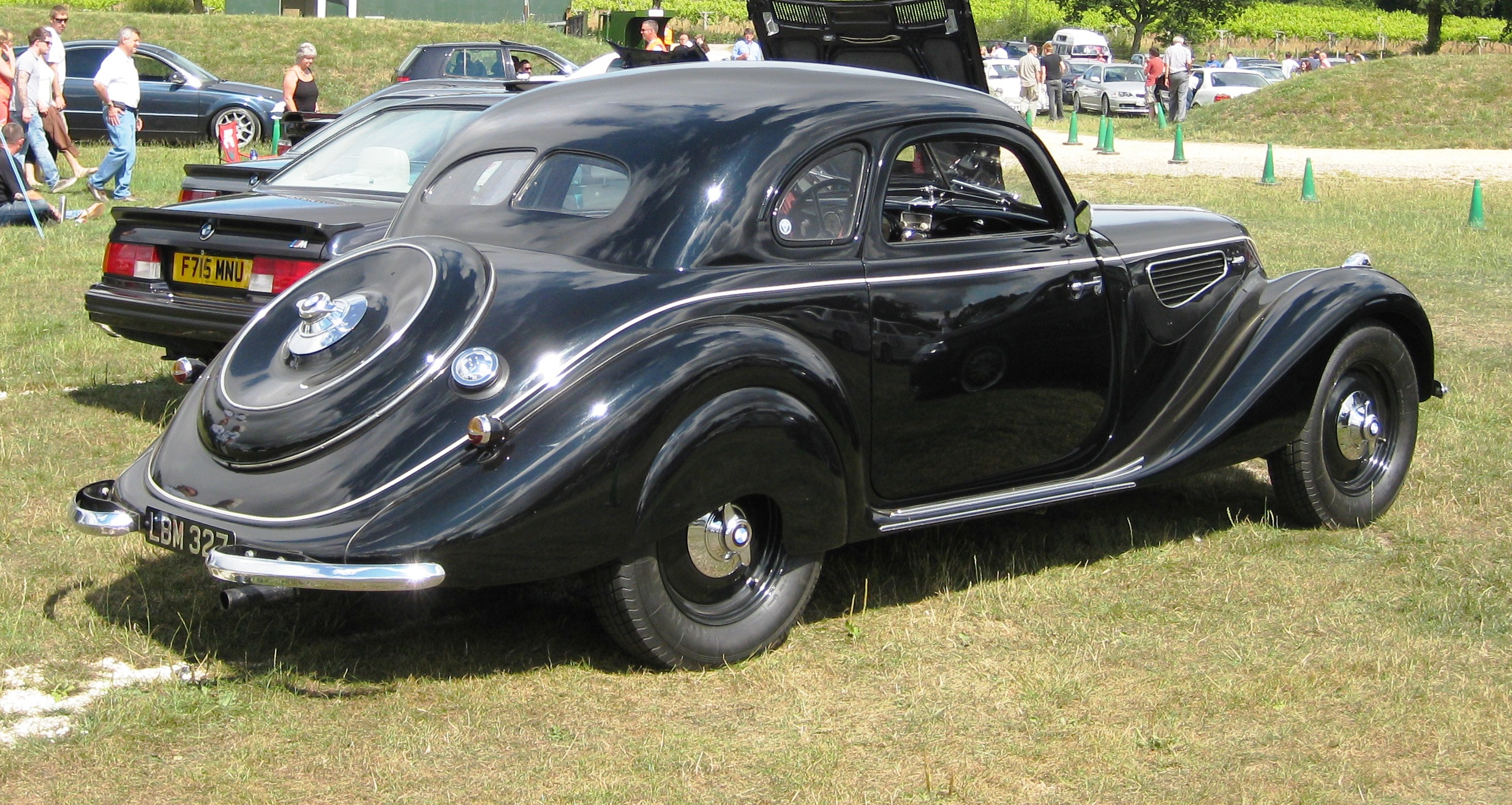
BMW 327 Coupé

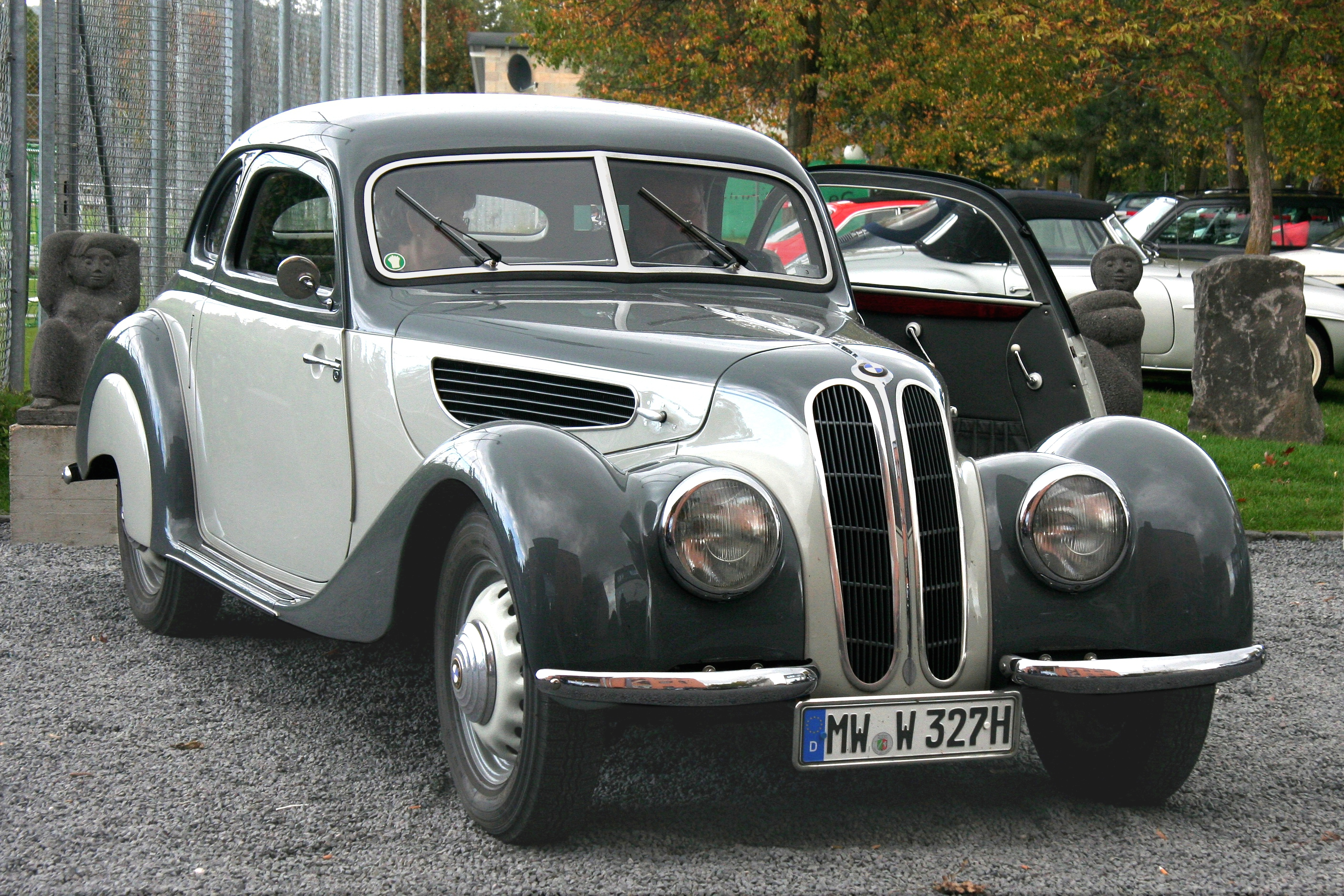
BMW 327 Coupé, built in 1940

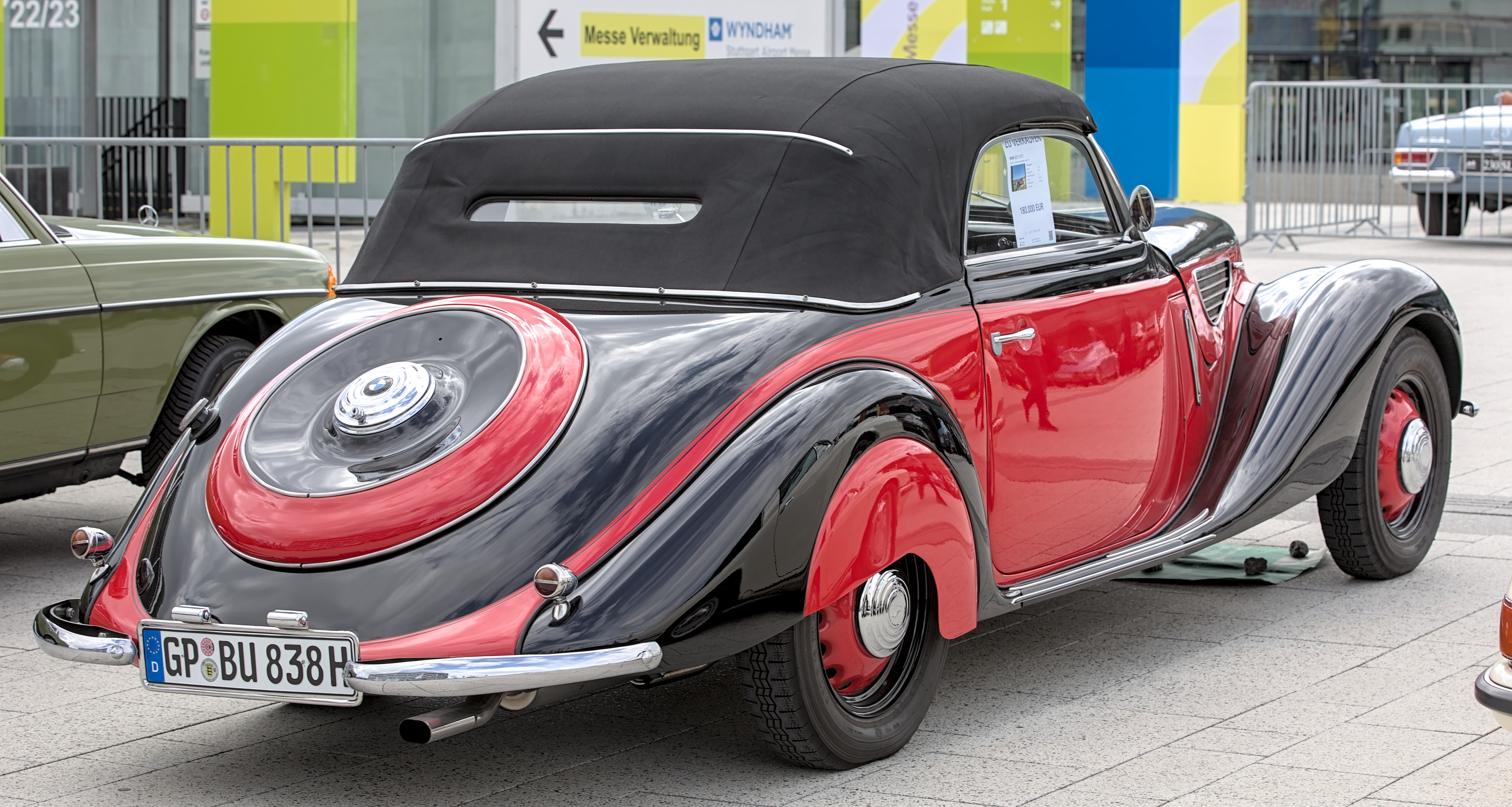
1938 BMW 327 Cabriolet

== Technical ==
Mechanically, the car utilised the hydraulic brake control, gear box, clutch and front suspension system first seen on the BMW 326, along with the live axle used on the BMW 320 and BMW 328. The BMW M78 straight-6 engine was used. The advertised top speed was 125 km/h (78 mph).

A higher-powered model, the 327/28, was offered with the M328 engine. 569 of these high-powered 327/28 cars were built up to 1940.

== Commercial ==
Among some enthusiasts, the 327 has subsequently been overshadowed by its more uncompromising sibling, the 80 PS (59 kW) BMW 328 which appeared in April 1936. In its day, however, the 327 was the bigger seller, with 1,396 base engined versions built between 1937 and 1941, and significant further production after 1945.

== Afterlife ==
During the 1930s, Eisenach was the centre of BMW’s automobile manufacturing. In 1945, Eisenach was occupied by United States forces. However, the wartime allies had already agreed that Thuringia would fall within the Soviet occupation zone. BMW's automobile factory in Eisenach was not fully destroyed, and assembly of the 327 resumed by a new company called Awtowelo, initially from partially completed cars from 1941 and later using stockpiled parts. About 150 post-war BMW 327 were built by Awtowelo before the factory officially changed names to EMW. Clear production figures are hard to obtain, but many of the 327s surviving with collectors into the twenty-first century were post-war products.

After the war, it became clear that the Soviets would not return the Eisenach factory to BMW. BMW-branded automobiles produced between 1945 and 1952 were therefore being produced outside the control of BMW headquarters in Munich. This caused a protracted dispute concerning title to the BMW brand and other assets, but in 1952 it was determined that Eisenach-produced models such as the 327s should be badged as EMW (Eisenacher Motorenwerk, Eisenach Motors' Works) rather than as BMW (Bayerische Motoren Werke, Bavarian Motors' Works). The BMW's blue and white badge from the Bavarian coat of arms changed to the EMW's red and white badge from the Thuringian coat of arms.

It is not clear how many of the post war 327s were branded as BMWs and how many as EMWs, but 505 were produced with one or other of the badges. Some time not long after 327 production had resumed, the body was changed slightly: all EMW 327s and some post-war BMW 327s have a different bonnet line; on the original design, the sides of the bonnet came down to nearly meet the fenderline, whereas later cars have fixed sides incorporating the hood vents. The East Germans also added a crease on the fenders around the wheelwells.

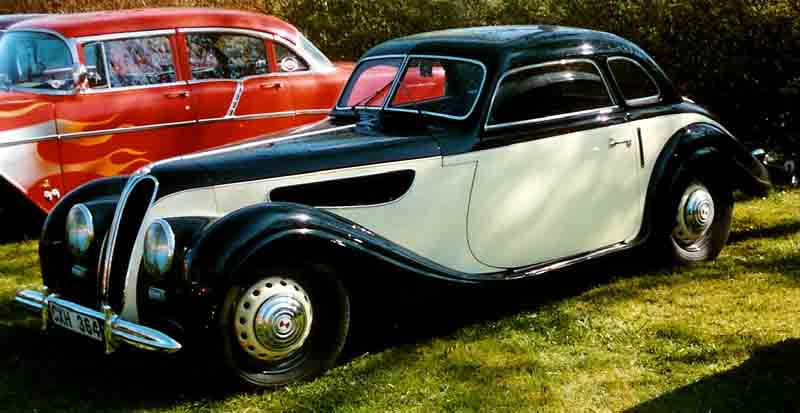
EMW 327, manufactured after the settlement of the name/badge dispute. Note creases on fenders and smaller bonnet.

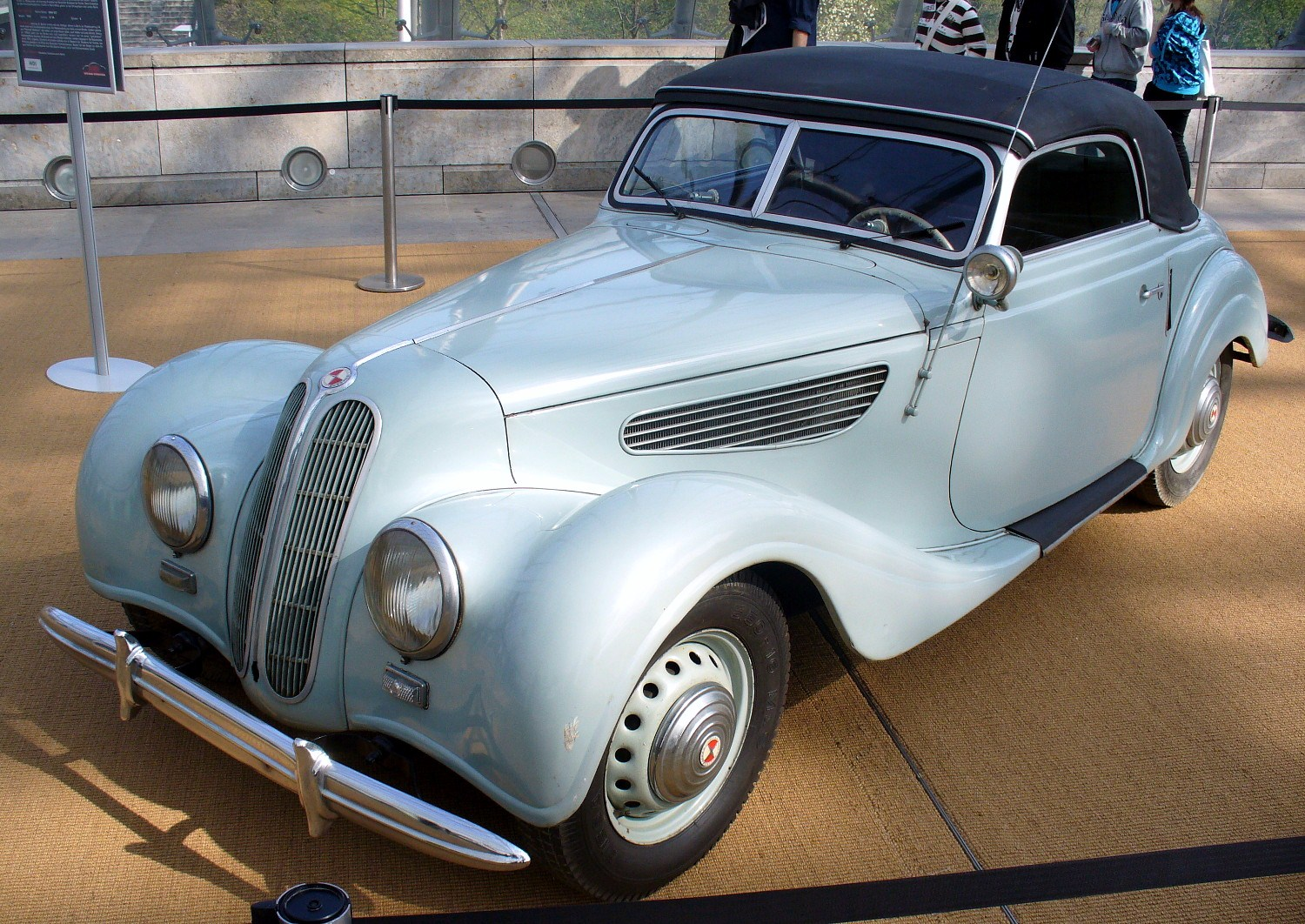
This 1952 EMW 327/2 Cabriolet originally belonged to Johannes R. Becher, Culture Minister of the GDR

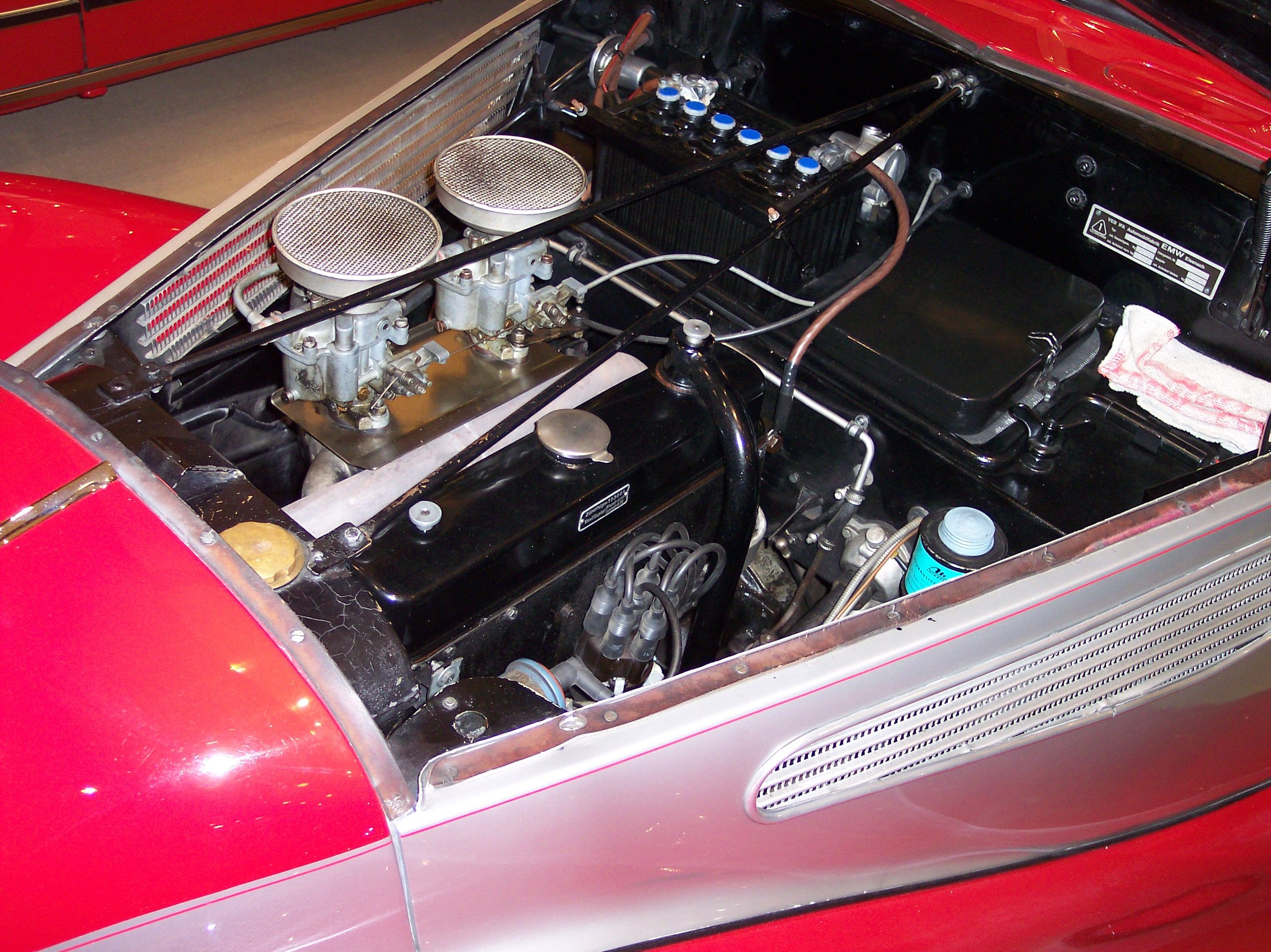
EMW 327 engine; note fixed sides of engine compartment

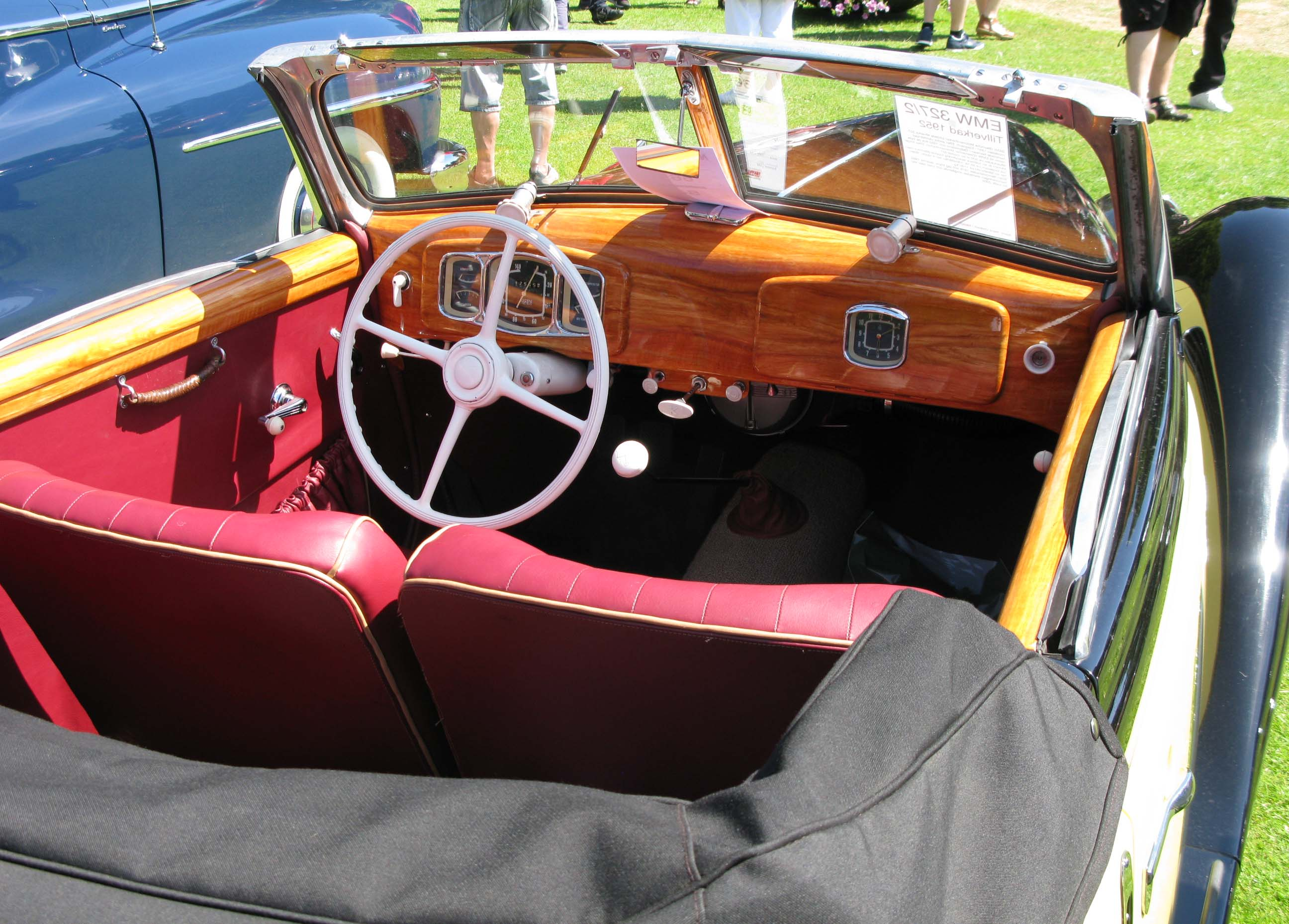
EMW 327 cabriolet interior
