= Bristol 401 and 402 =

Bristol 401 Bristol 402
- 1951 Bristol 401

Overview
- Manufacturer: Bristol Cars (then Bristol Aeroplane Co.)
- Production: 1948–1953 (401); 611 built; 1949–1950 (402); 23 built
- Assembly: United Kingdom: Filton
- Designer: Carrozzeria Touring

Body and chassis
- Class: Sports saloon
- Body style: 2-door coupé (401); 2-door convertible (402)
- Layout: FR layout

Powertrain
- Engine: 1971 cc OHV I6
- Transmission: 4-speed manual

Dimensions
- Wheelbase: 114 in (2,896 mm)
- Length: 191.5 in (4,864 mm)
- Width: 67 in (1,702 mm)
- Height: 60 in (1,524 mm)

Chronology
- Predecessor: Bristol 400
- Successor: Bristol 403

The Bristol 401 saloon and Bristol 402 cabriolet are British luxury grand tourers, produced between 1948 and 1953 by Bristol Cars, an offshoot of the Bristol Aeroplane Company They were developed from the Bristol 400, which continued in production alongside the 401 and 402 until 1950.

The 401 and 402 use an improved version of the BMW 328 hemispherical-head engine and its unusual arrangement of two separate pushrods to operate the exhaust valves, necessitated by the hemispherical combustion chambers and opposite facing valves, as used in the 400. However, the styling was an advance on that first Bristol model. It was inspired by a Milanese designer, Carrozzeria Touring, and its most notable feature is that the door handles are not exposed. The doors are opened by pressing a button in the door. The body is more spacious than the 400, and is a full five-seater.

At the front the 401 and 402 are also distinctive, with their headlights positioned quite a distance toward the centre-line of the body, either side of the narrow grille, which resembles BMW grille a little less than does the 400's. They are also deeply curved at the front: this, along with the then-unique door handle arrangement, is believed to give the 401 a drag coefficient of less than Cd 0.36 – competitive even by today's standards and remarkable for the time.

The engine is the same 2-litre in-line six-cylinder petrol unit as in the 400, but upgraded with improved Solex carburettors to increase power by 5 bhp (3.7 kW) to 85 bhp (63 kW). This improved the performance further beyond what was achieved by the aerodynamics.

The suspension is independent at the front, using a transverse leaf spring and wishbones. The rigid axle at the rear has torsion bars. Steering is by rack and pinion. The brakes are Lockheed hydraulic, with 11 in (279 mm) drums all round.

Bristol made 611 401s, which is still the largest production run of any Bristol model. However, it made only 23 402s, which makes it one of the rarest historic cars of its era. In a recent survey, 13 of those 23 were accounted for.

A saloon tested by The Motor magazine in 1952 recorded a top speed of 97.3 mph (156.6 km/h), and accelerated from 0 to 60 mph (97 km/h) in 15.1 seconds. A fuel consumption of 20.8 miles per imperial gallon (13.6 L/100 km; 17.3 mpg_{‑US}) was recorded. The test car cost £3,532 including taxes. Referring to that road test in a 1971 "classic car" feature, the journal summarised the 401 as a "Medium-sized car offering very high standards of comfort and performance".

401 Touring Superleggera (1949)

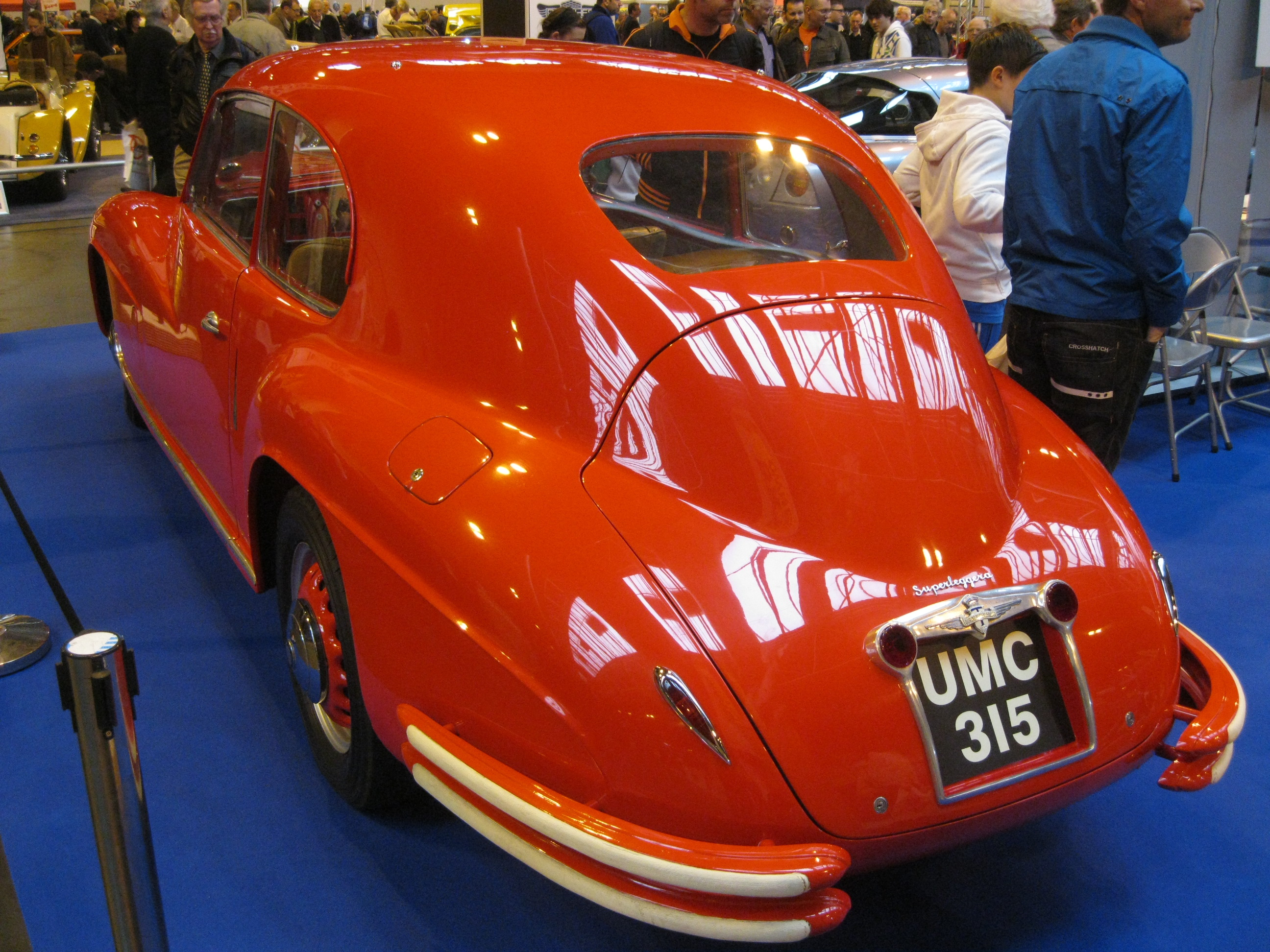
Rear view of the Superleggera

Rear view of a 1951 401

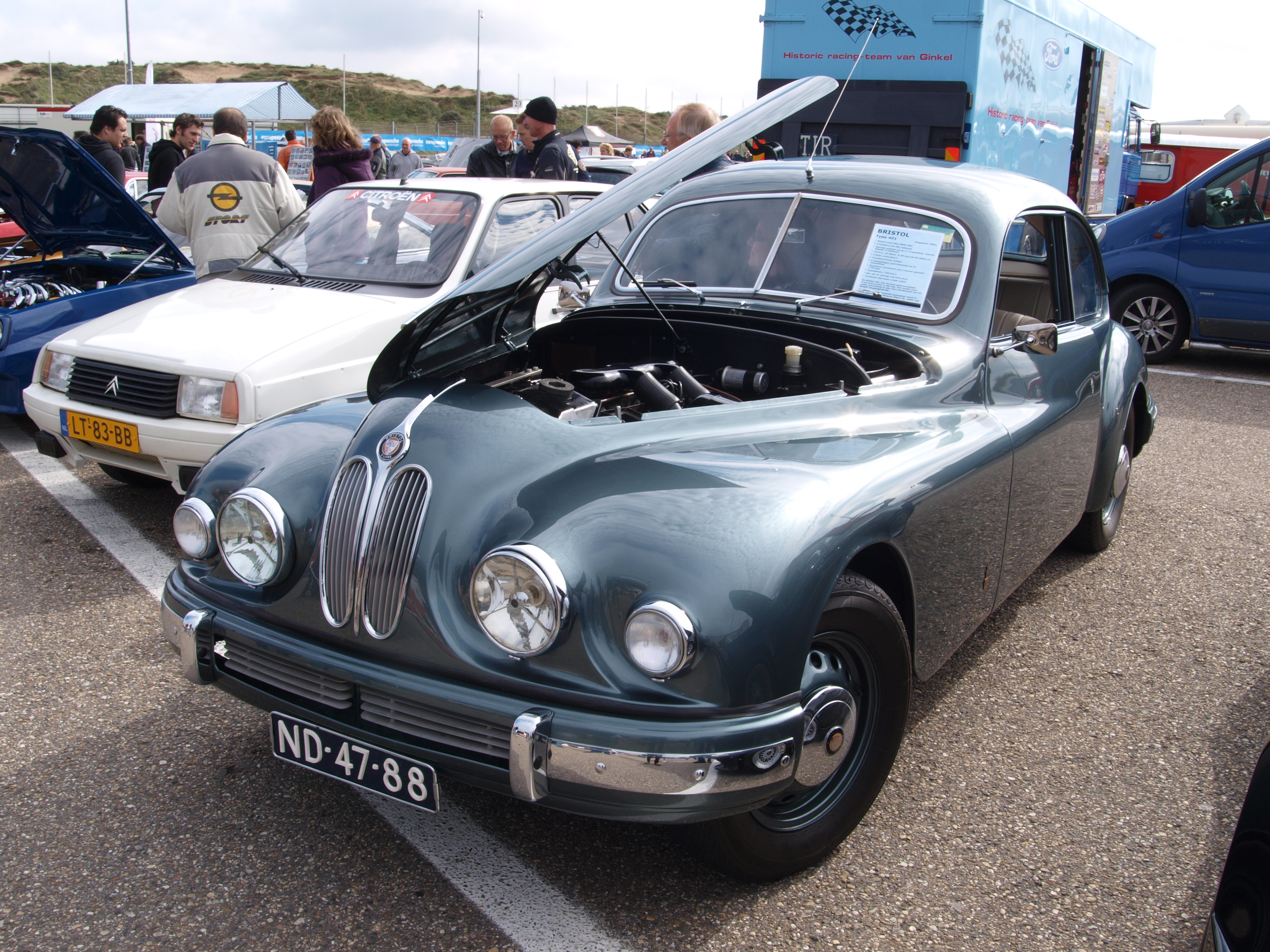
Bristol 401 with bonnet open

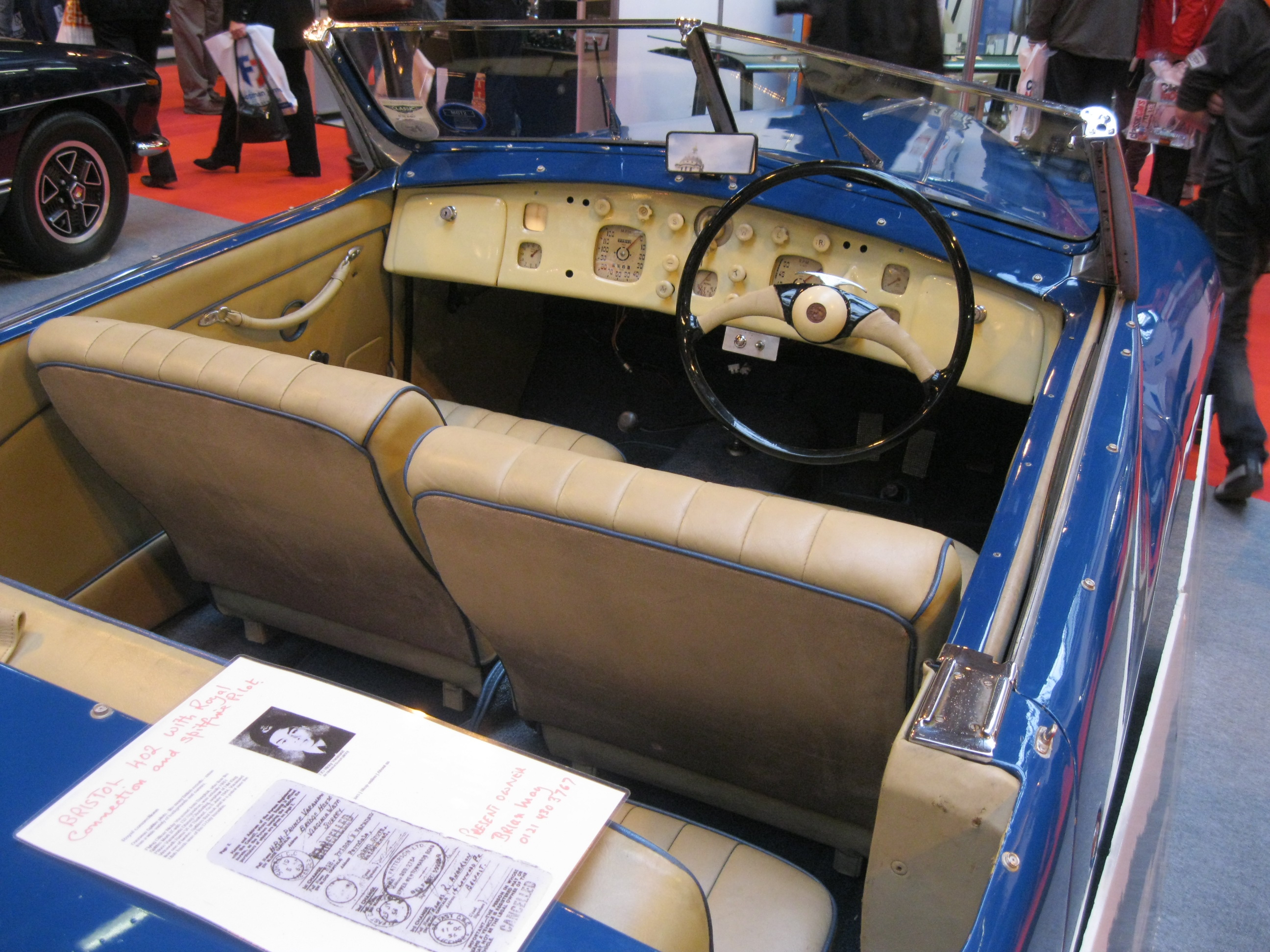
402 interior

1950 Bristol 402

== 401 Farina Cabriolet ==
Four examples of a 401 Cabriolet with styling by Pininfarina were also built.
