= Bristol 400 =

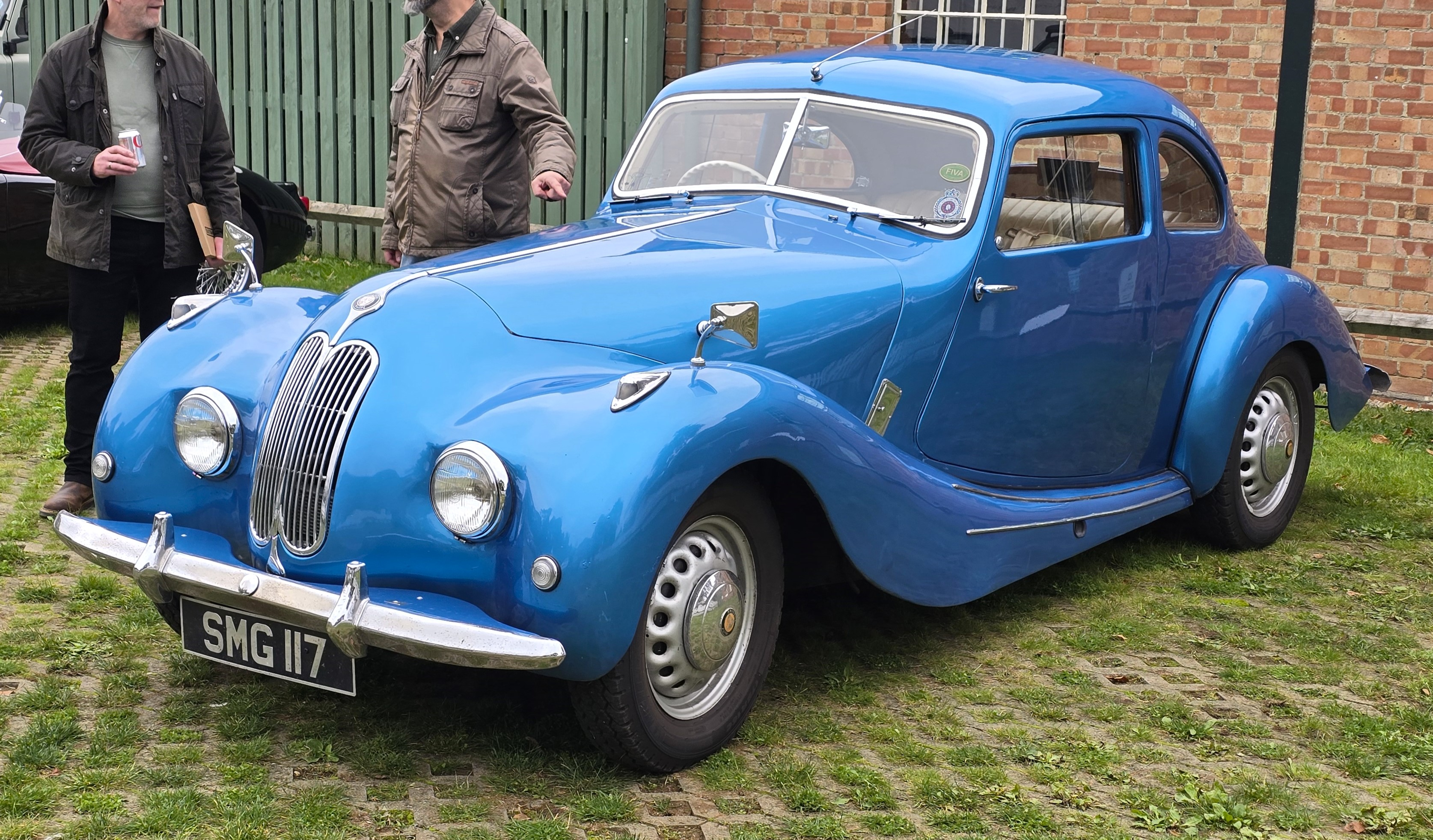
- 1947 Bristol 400

Overview
- Manufacturer: Bristol Cars (then Bristol Aeroplane Co.)
- Production: 1947–1950; 487 units
- Assembly: United Kingdom: Filton

Body and chassis
- Class: Sports saloon
- Body style: 2-door saloon
- Layout: FR layout
- Related: BMW 327

Powertrain
- Engine: 1971 cc OHV I6
- Transmission: 4-speed manual

Chronology
- Successor: Bristol 401

The Bristol 400 is a luxury car made by the Bristol Cars division of the Bristol Aeroplane Company. Manufactured from 1947 to 1950, it was the first model of car that the company made.

As World War II progressed, Bristol Aircraft considered its future, which resulted in forming a car division in 1945, later becoming the Bristol Cars company in its own right. Engineers from Bristol inspected the Soviet-controlled BMW factory at Eisenach in the Soviet occupation zone in Germany, and returned to Britain with plans for the BMW 327 and the BMW six-cylinder engine as official war reparations. Bristol then employed BMW engineer Fritz Fiedler to lead its engine development team.

In 1946 Bristol Aircraft acquired a majority shareholding in Frazer Nash, which in the 1930s held a licence to build the BMW 328. In 1947 the newly-formed Bristol Cars released its 400 coupé. It is a lengthened version of the BMW 327, and features BMW's double-kidney radiator grille.

Bristol based the 400 on the best features of two outstanding pre-war BMWs: the engine of the 328, and the chassis of the 326. These were covered with a mainly steel body but with aluminium bonnet, door and boot skins inspired by the 327. The 400 has a slightly modified version of BMW's six-cylinder pushrod engine of 1,971 cc (bore 66 mm, stroke 96 mm). This engine, considered advanced for its time due to its hemispherical combustion chambers and very short inlet and exhaust ports, develops 80 horsepower at 4,500 rpm, and gives the car a top speed of about 148 km/h (92 mph), with acceleration to match.

In order to form a hemispherical combustion chamber, the valves are positioned at an angle to the head. In order to drive both sets of valves from a single camshaft, the Bristol engine uses a system of rods, followers and bell-cranks to drive the valves on the far side of the engine from the camshaft. Owners soon found that setting and maintaining the numerous clearances in the system was difficult, but vital to keep the engine in tune. The gearbox is a four-speed manual with synchromesh on the upper three ratios and a freewheel in first.

The 400 is the only Bristol that has a steel and aluminium skin. It has all flat glass, apart from the curved rear window, which is glazed in Perspex, and was available to specification with a top hinge. This was very welcome on warmer climate export markets, where the sliding door windows provided only marginal ventilation to the occupants.

The 400 has independent front suspension with a transverse leaf spring and a live axle, located by an A-bracket over the differential case, and longitudinal torsion bars with transverse arms and brackets at the rear. It has a lengthy 2,895 mm (114.0 in) wheelbase and a very BMW-like grille at the front of its long bonnet. The passenger area is very short, with the spare tyre mounted inside the boot on the first cars. In later 400s the spare wheel is mounted on the rear hinged boot lid, inside an aluminium cover.

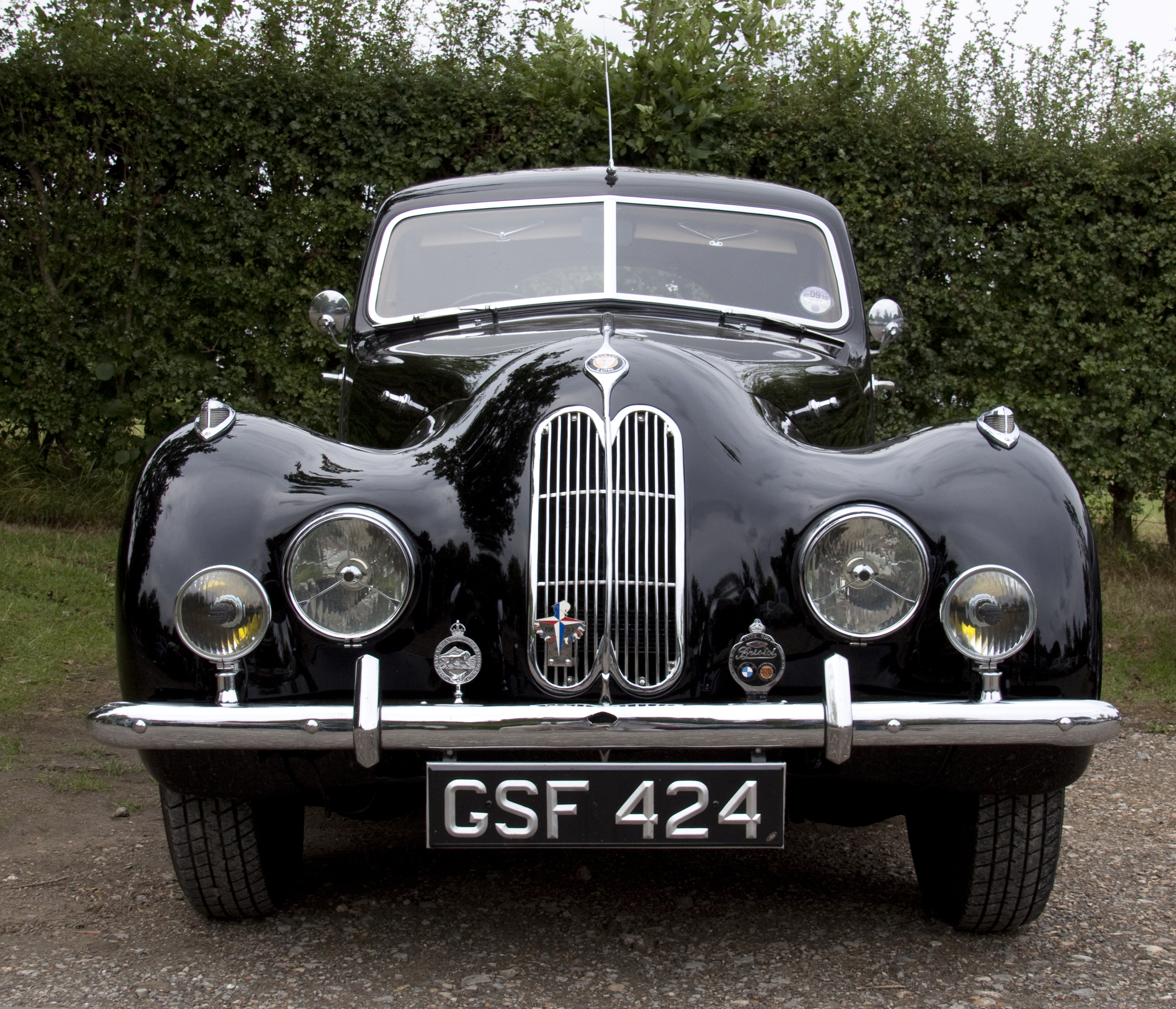
1949 Bristol 400 (front view)

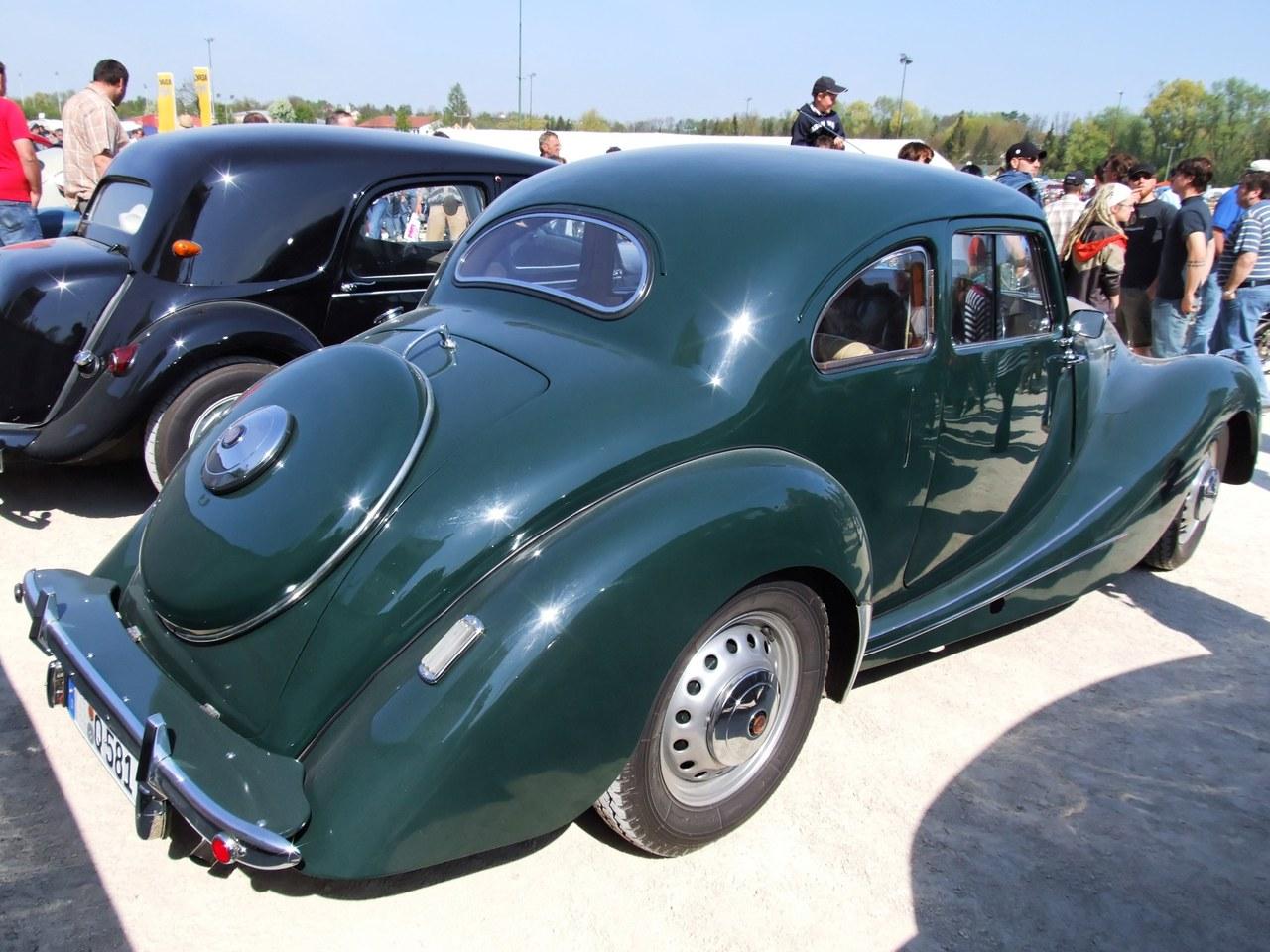
Bristol 400 (Rear quarter view)

Battista Pininfarina designed an alternative body for the 400. Its lines prefigure the 400's successor model, the 401, which Bristol launched in 1948.

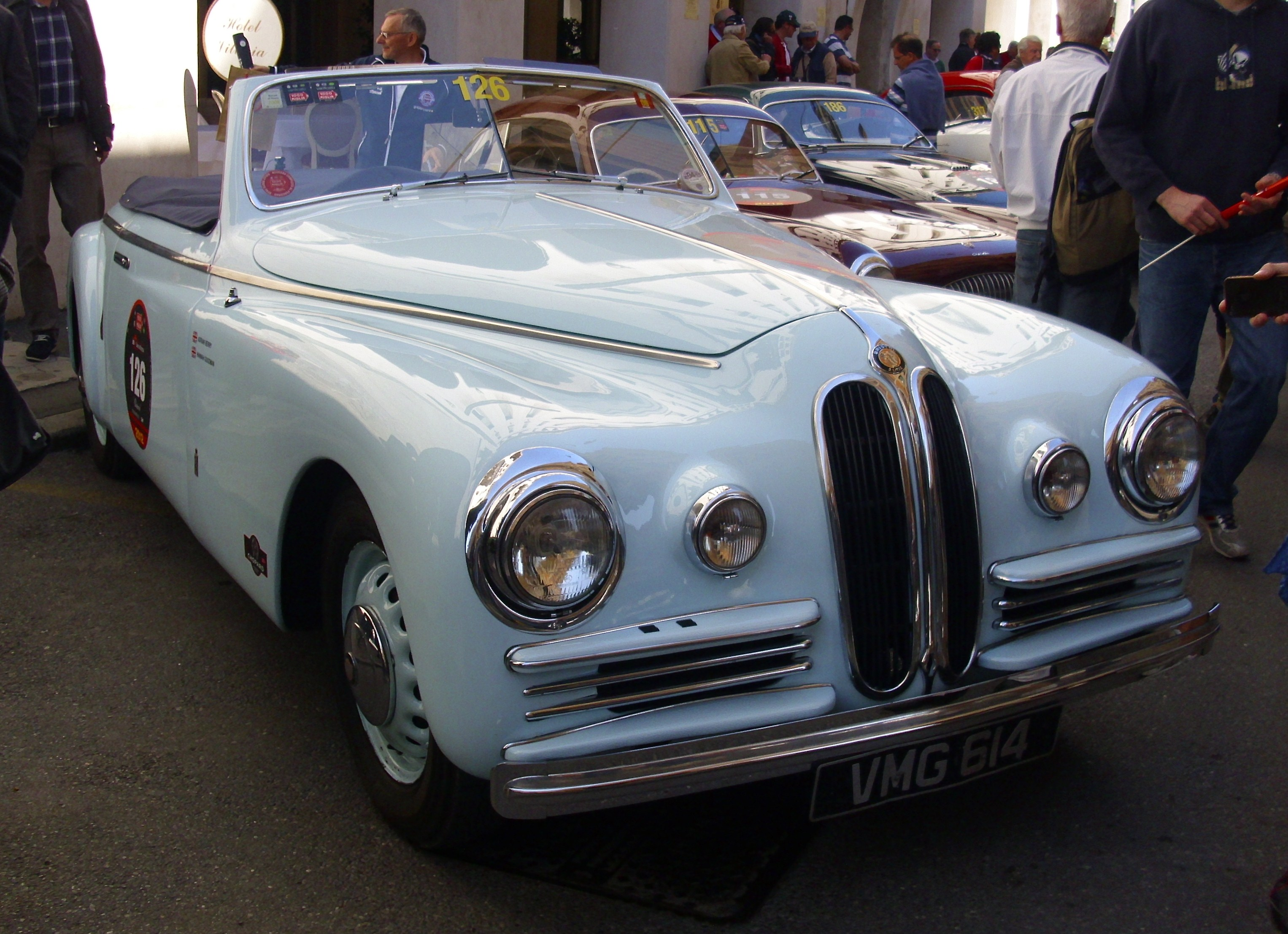
Farina-styled Bristol 400 (1949)

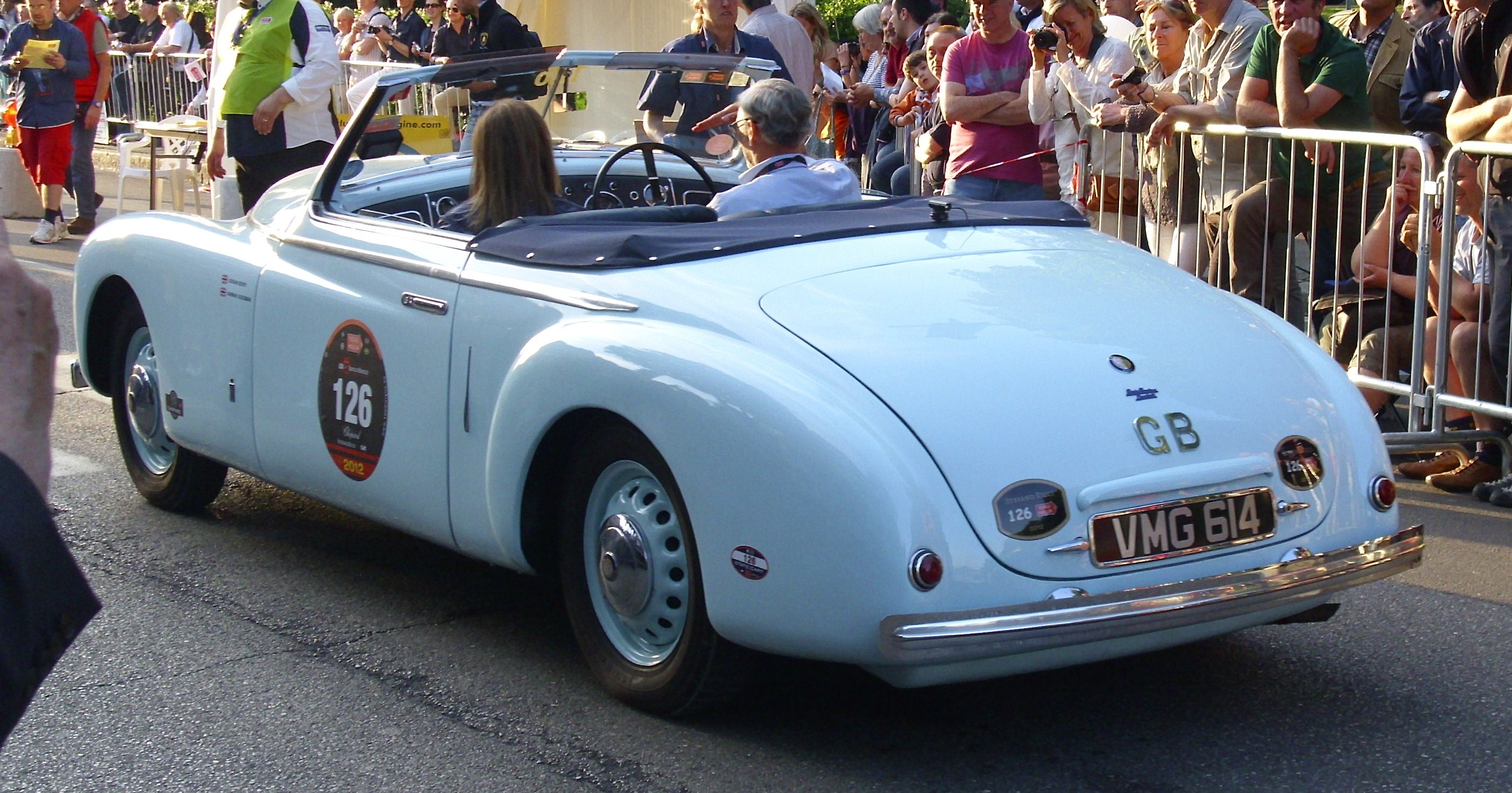
Farina-styled Bristol 400 (1949)
