= BMW HH =

Formula 2 racing car

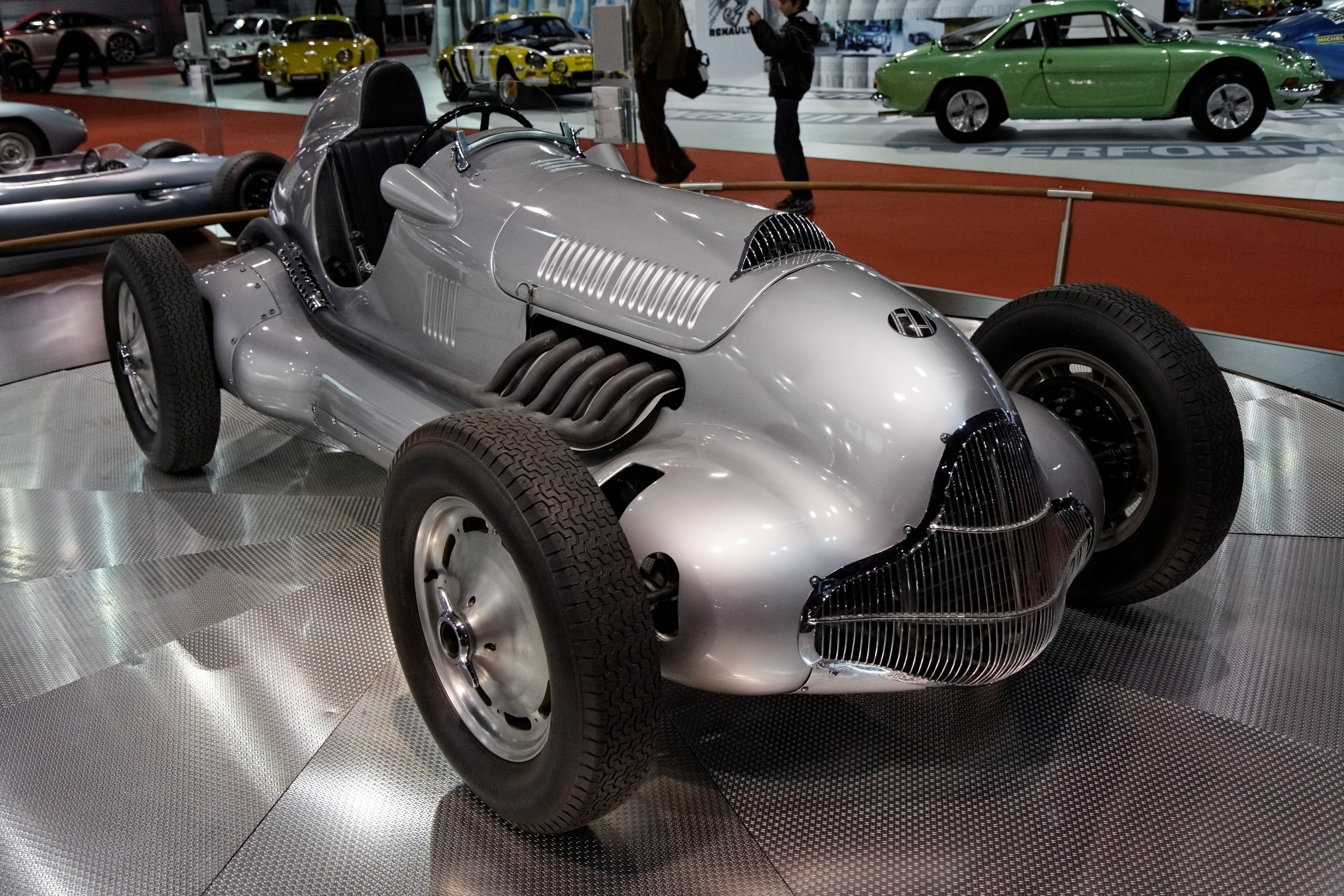
- Category: Formula 2
- Constructor: BMW
- Designer: Herman Holbein
- Production: 1947-1950
- Successor: BMW 269

Technical specifications
- Engine: BMW M328, 1,971 cm^{3} (120.3 cu in), L6, NA
- Torque: 200 N⋅m (148 lb⋅ft)
- Transmission: 4-speed manual
- Power: 130 hp (97 kW)
- Weight: 510 kg (1,120 lb)

Competition history
- Notable drivers: (Germany) Fritz Riess (Germany) Günther Bechem
- Debut: 1947

The BMW HH is an open-wheel Formula 2 racing car . It was produced between 1947 and 1950 by BMW.

== History ==
In 1947, following the creation of the Formula 2 racing category by the FIA, BMW HH47, HH48, and HH49 one-person vehicles were designed by Herman Holbein (then head of BMW's chassis development department).

They are equipped with 2.0-liter 6-cylinder engines of 130 hp (97 kW), for a 200 km/h (120 mph) top speed, from the BMW 328 and piloted among others by German drivers Fritz Riess and Günther Bechem.

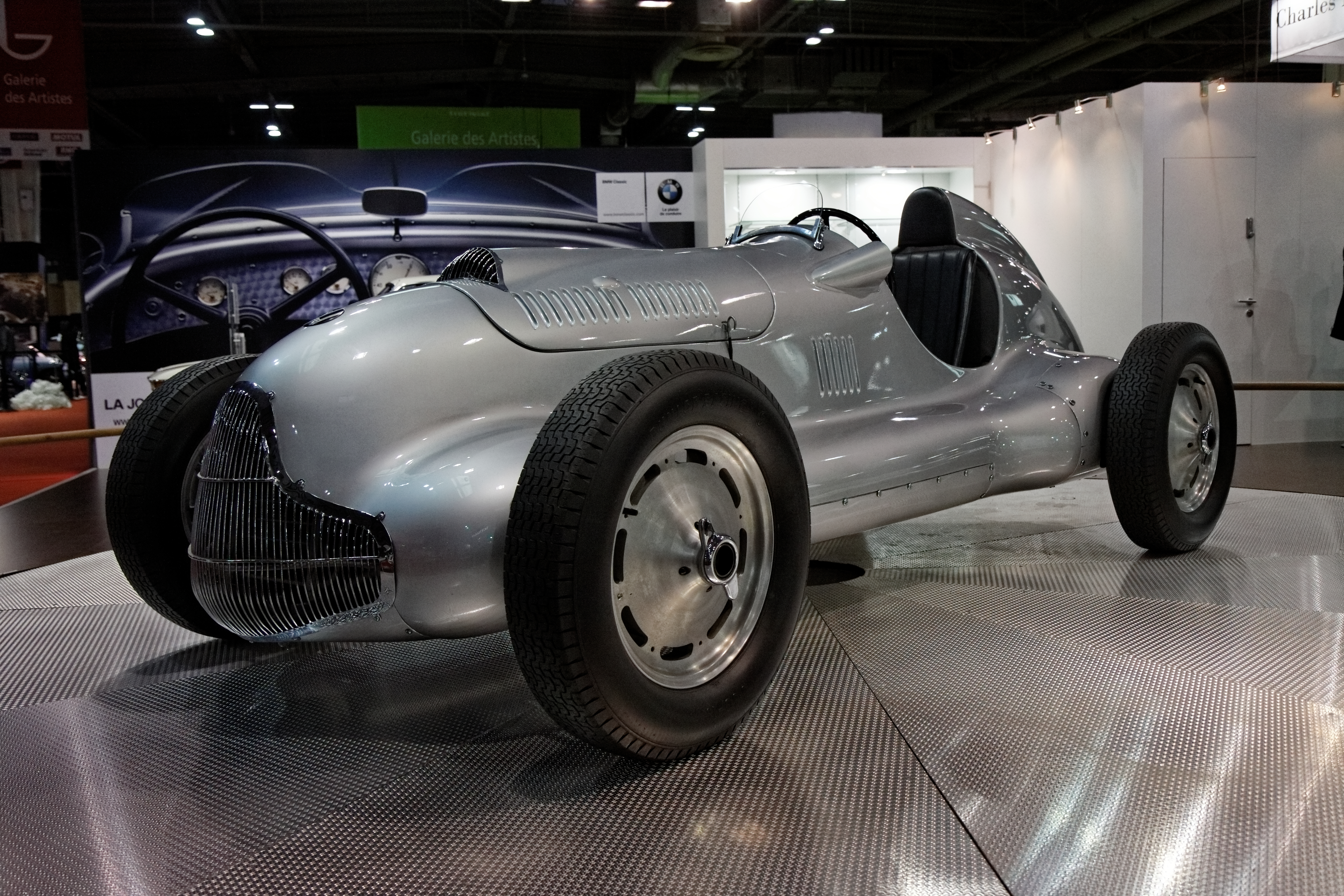
Front

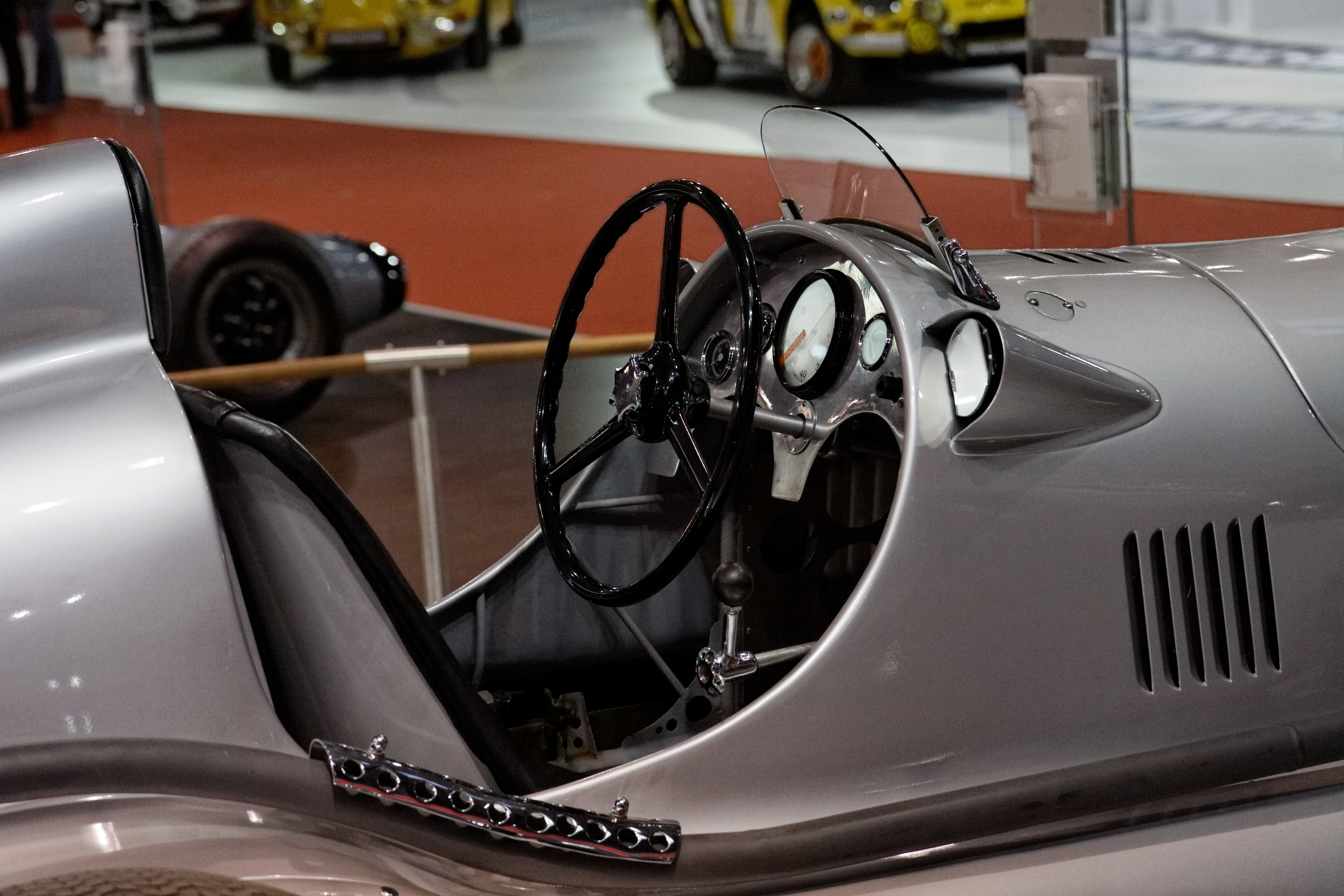
Cockpit and interior

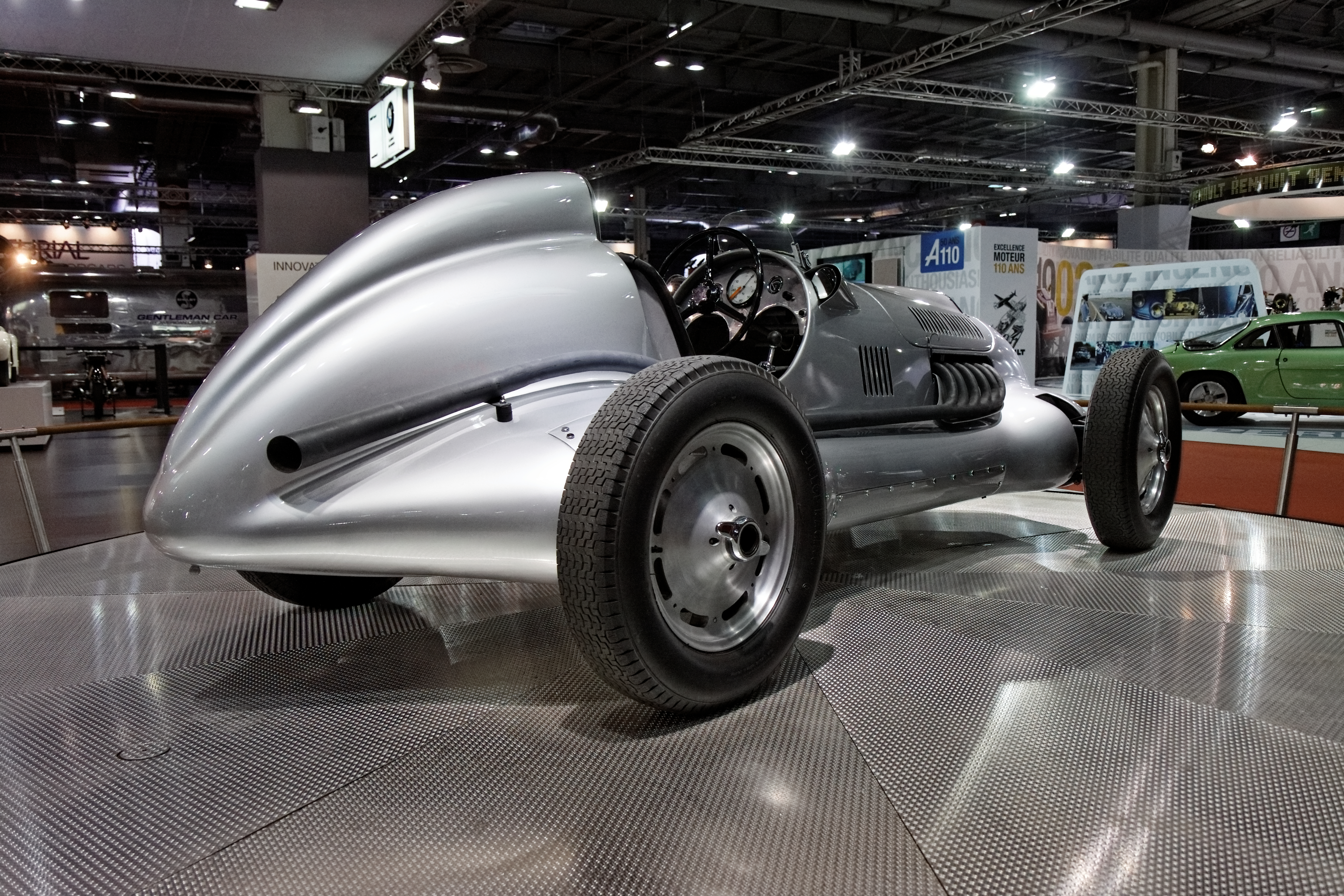
Rear
