= Opel Kadett =

German small car model

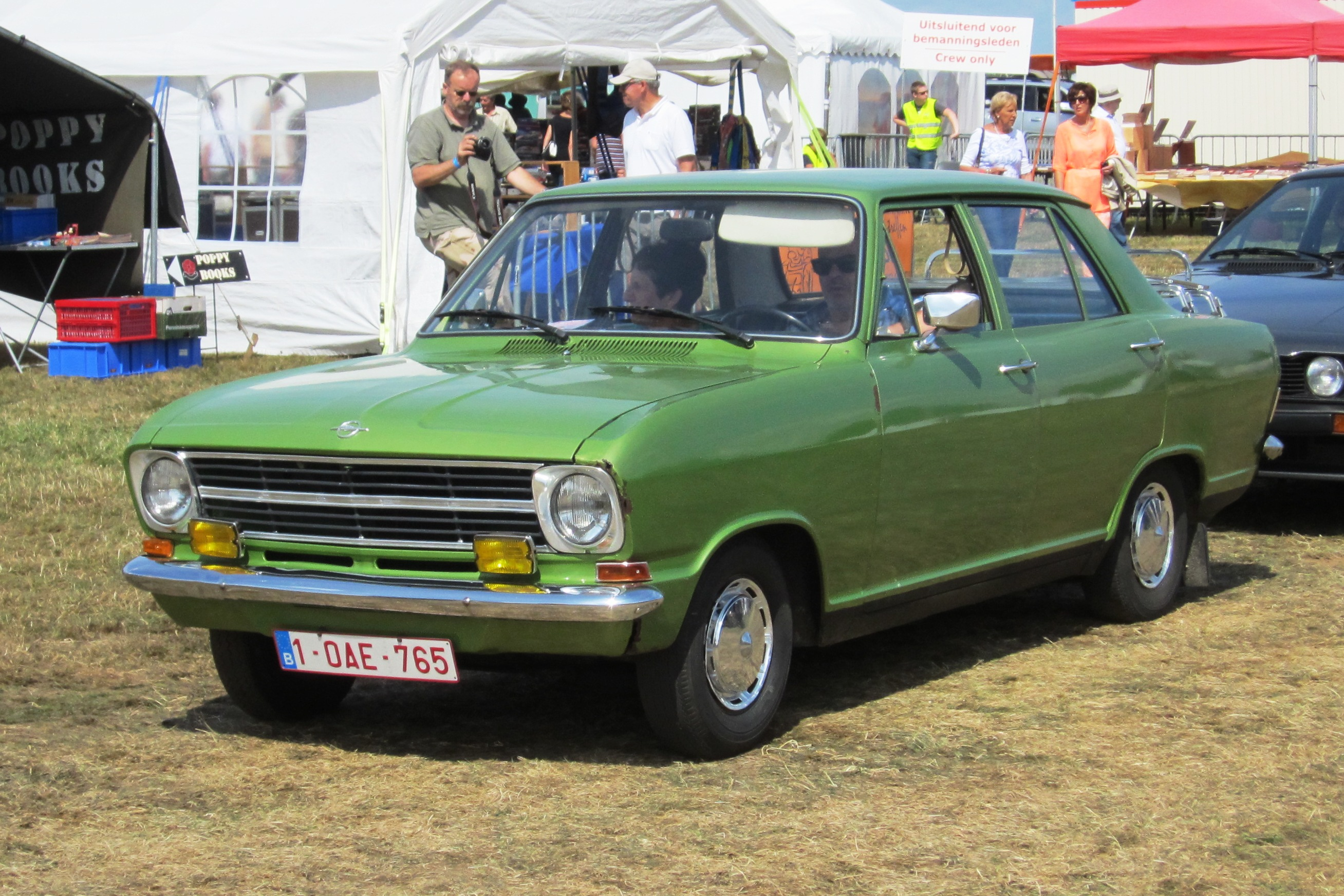

Overview
- Manufacturer: Opel
- Production: 1936–1940; 1962–1993

Body and chassis
- Class: Small family car (C)
- Layout: Front-engine, rear-wheel-drive (1936–1979); Transverse front-engine, front-wheel drive (1979–1993)

Chronology
- Predecessor: Opel 1.3 litre
- Successor: Opel Astra

The Opel Kadett is a small family car produced by the German automobile manufacturer Opel from 1936 until 1940 and then from 1962 until 1991 (the Cabrio continued until 1993), when it was succeeded by the Opel Astra.

Originally, the Kadett was Opel's smallest model; however, as it grew in size with each generation (ultimately competing in the European C-segment), the Opel Corsa became GM/Opel's entry-level model.

== Kadett I (1936–1940) ==
Kadett I
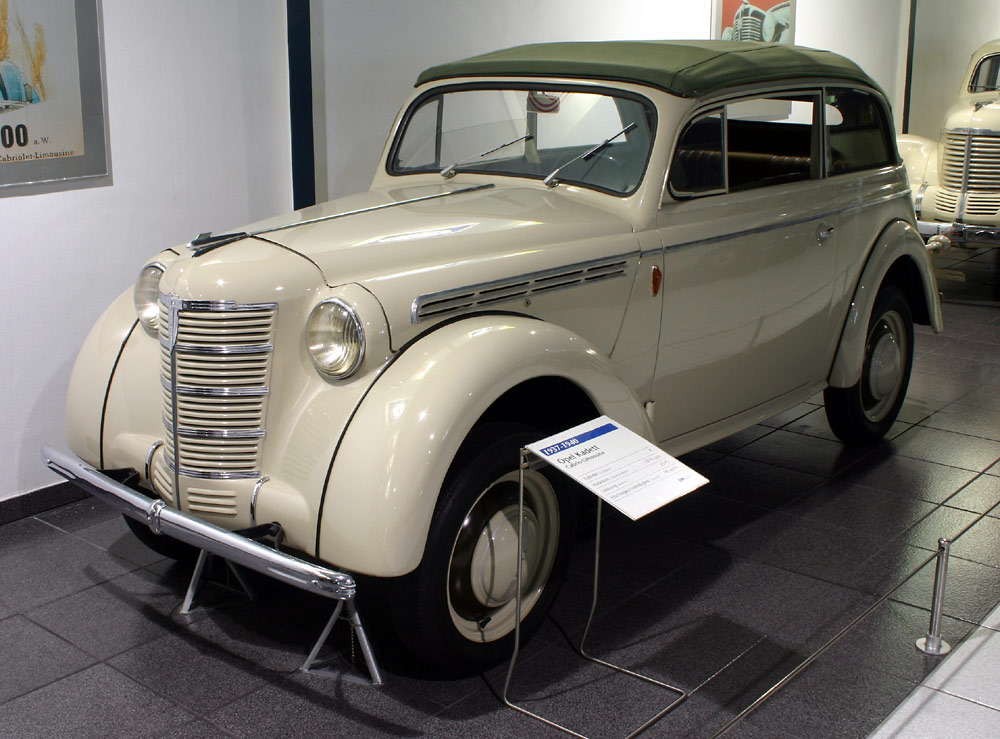
- Opel Kadett Spezial (K38) "Cabrio-Limousine" (1939)

Overview
- Production: 1936–1940
- Assembly: Germany: Rüsselsheim

Body and chassis
- Layout: Front-engine, rear-wheel-drive
- Related: Moskvitch 400/420

Powertrain
- Engine: 1,074 cc sv I4
- Transmission: 3-speed manual

Dimensions
- Wheelbase: 2,337 mm (92.0 in)
- Length: 3,765–3,840 mm (148.2–151.2 in)
- Width: 1,375 mm (54.1 in)
- Height: 1,455–1,545 mm (57.3–60.8 in)
- Curb weight: 757 kg (1,669 lb)

The first Opel car to carry the Kadett name was presented to the public in December 1936 by Opel's commercial-technical director, Heinrich Nordhoff, who would in later decades become known for his leadership role in building up the Volkswagen company. Production was interrupted in 1940 by World War II.

The new Kadett followed the innovative Opel Olympia in adopting a chassis-less unibody construction, suggesting that, like the Vauxhall 10 introduced in 1937 by Opel's English sister-company, the Opel Kadett was designed for high-volume, low-cost production.

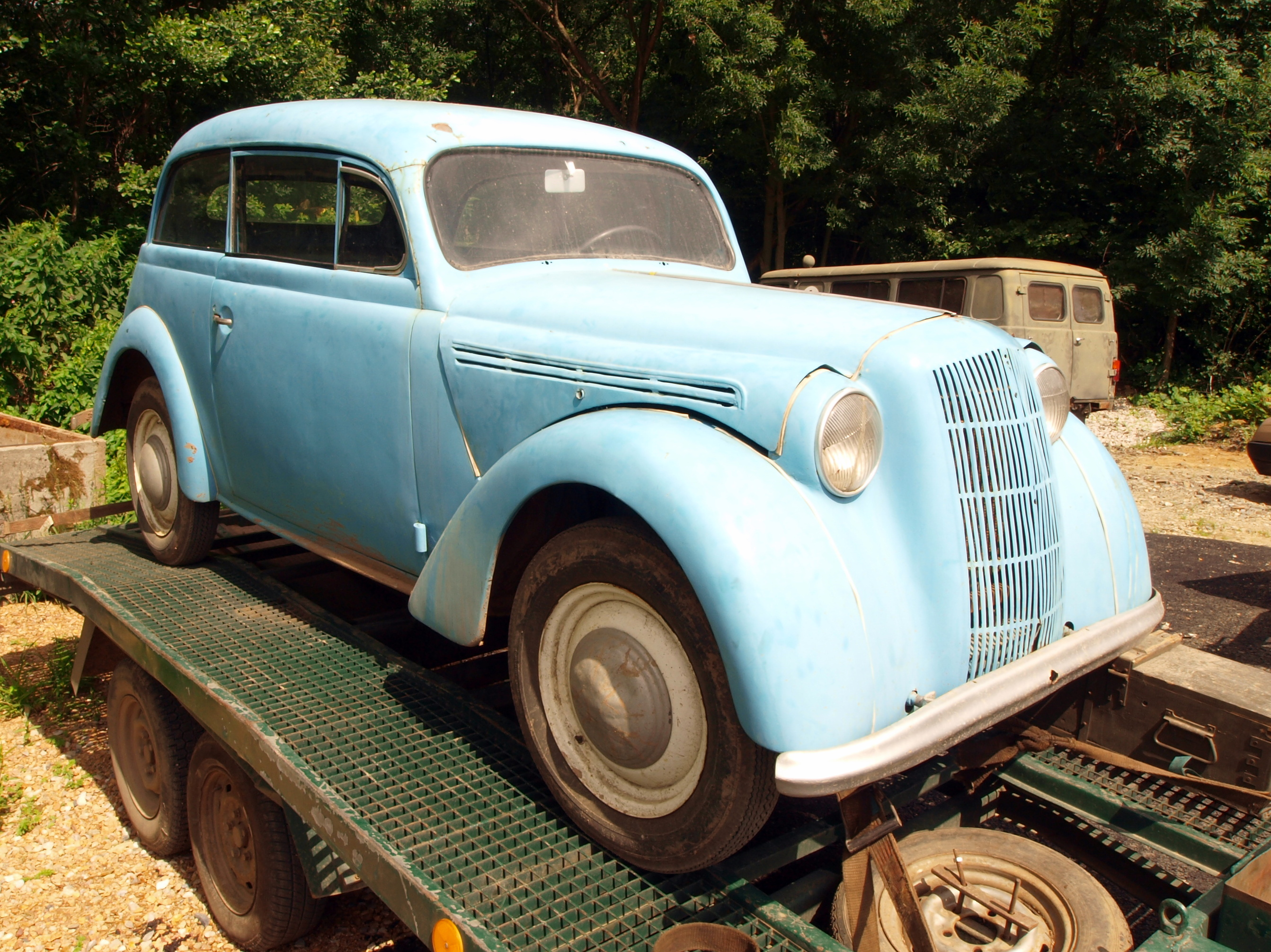
Opel Kadett "Limousine" 11234, with the 1937 front. The grille was restyled for 1938.

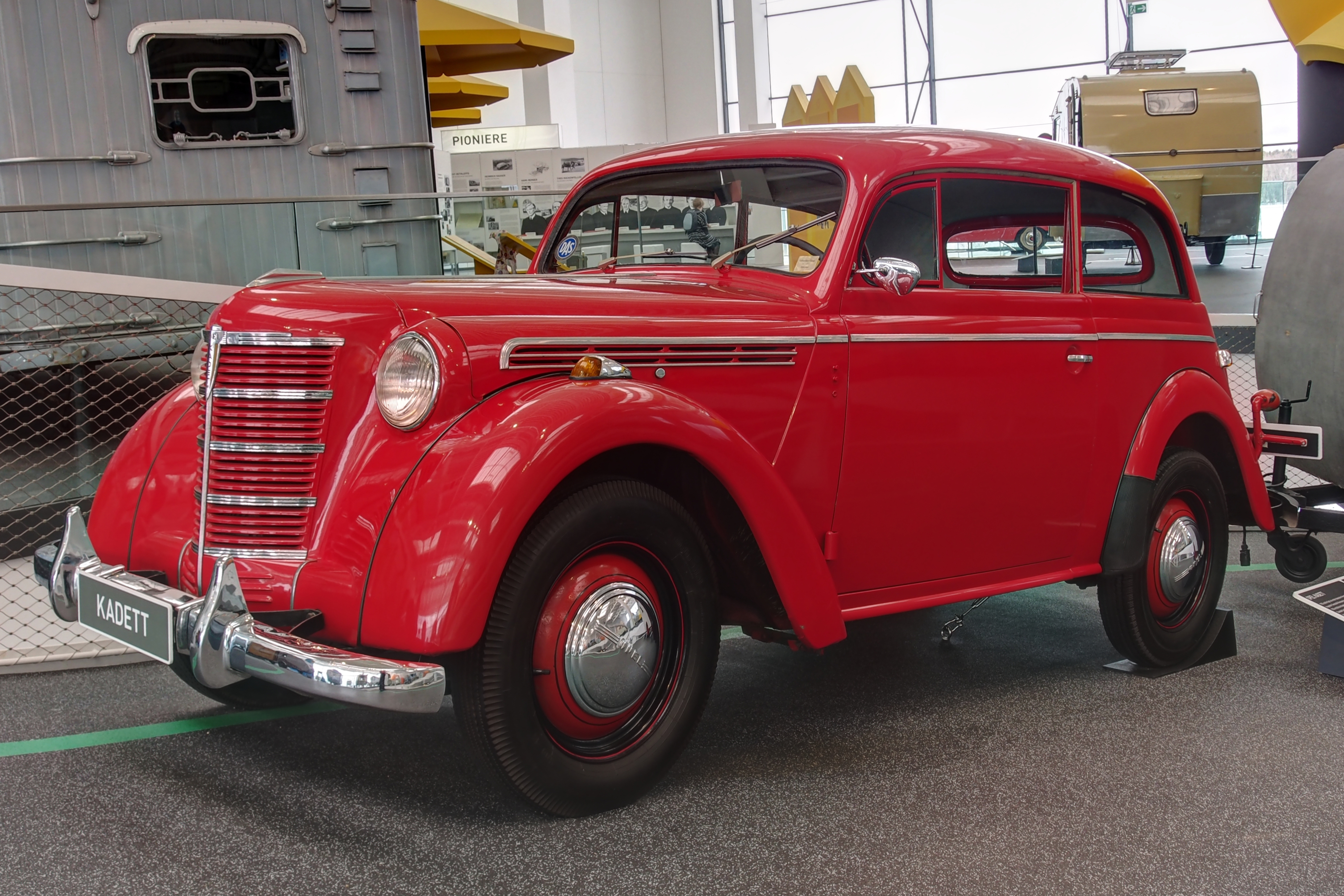
1938 Opel Kadett

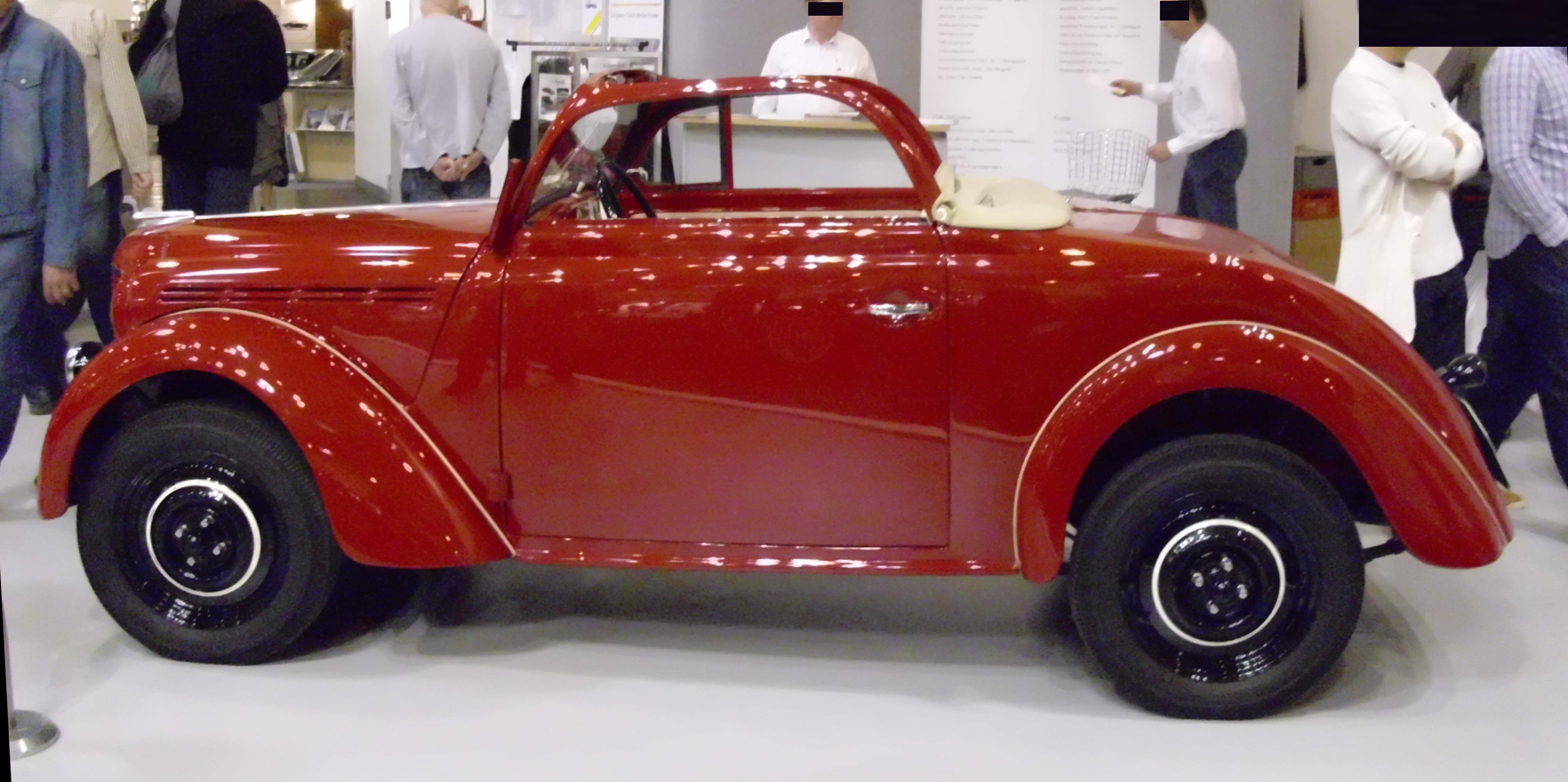
Opel Kadett Strolch (1938)

=== Kadett serie 11234 (1937) ===
For 1937 the Kadett was offered as a small and unpretentious two door "Limousine" (saloon) or, at the same list price of 2,100 ℛ︁ℳ︁, as a soft top "Cabrio-Limousine". The body resembled that of the existing larger Opel Olympia and its silhouette reflected the "streamlining" tendencies of the time. The 1,074 cc side-valve engine came from the 1935 Opel P4 and came with the same listed maximum power output of 23 PS (17 kW) at 3,400 rpm. The wheelbase, at 234 cm (92 in), was right between the little P4 and the larger Olympia. The "11234" nomenclature stands for the engine's displacement in deciliters (11) followed by the wheelbase in centimeters (234).

The brakes were now controlled using a hydraulic mechanism. The suspension featured synchronous springing, a suspension configuration already seen on the manufacturer's larger models and based on the Dubonnet system for which General Motors in France had purchased the license. The General Motors version, which had been further developed by Opel's North American parent, was intended to provide a soft ride, but there was some criticism that handling and road-holding were compromised, especially when the system was applied to small lightweight cars such as the Kadett. By the end of 1937 33,402 of these first-generation Kadetts had been produced.

=== Kadett "KJ38" and "K38 Spezial" (1938–1940) ===
From December 1937 a modified front grille identified an upgrade. The 1,074 cc Opel 23 PS (17 kW) engine and the 2,337 mm (92.0 in) wheelbase were unchanged, with few differences between the cars for 1937 and those for 1938.

The manufacturer now offered two versions of the Kadett, designated the "Kadett KJ38 and the "Kadett K38" the latter also being sold as the "Kadett Spezial". Mechanically and in terms of published performance there was little to differentiate the two, but the "Spezial" had a chrome stripe below the window line and extra external body trim in other areas such as on the front grille. The interior of the "Spezial" was also better equipped. To the extent that the 300 Mark saving for buyers of the car reflected reduced production costs, the major difference was that the more basic "KJ38" lost the synchromous springing with which the car had been launched, and which continued to be fitted on the "Spezial". The base car instead reverted to traditional rigid axle based suspension similar to that fitted on the old Opel P4.

The base car was available only as a two-door "Limousine" (saloon). Customers looking for a soft-top "Cabrio-limousine" would need to specify a "Kadett Spezial". For the first time Kadett buyers, provided they were prepared to choose a "Kadett Spezial" could also specify a four-door "Limousine" (saloon) bodied car, priced at 2,350 ℛ︁ℳ︁ as against 2,150 ℛ︁ℳ︁ for a "Spezial Cabrio-Limousine" and 2,100 ℛ︁ℳ︁ for a two-door "Spezial Limousine".

The "Kadett KJ38" was intended to fill the market segment of the Opel P4, but the KJ38, priced at 1,800 ℛ︁ℳ︁, was more expensive than the P4 and its reduced specification left it with the image of a car for poor people (..Image des Arme-Leute-Autos..) at a time when economic growth in Germany was finally fostering a less minimalist approach to car buying. The "Kadett K38 Spezial" fared better in the market place: in 1938 and again in 1939 it was Germany's top-selling small car. By May 1941 the company had produced 17,871 "Kadett KJ38"s and 56,335 "Kadett K38 Spezial"s.

=== Commercial ===
Competitive pricing led to commercial success, and Kadetts continued to be produced during the early months of the war: by the time production ended in May 1940, following the intensification of World War II, 106,608 of these Opel Kadetts were produced on the assembly line at Opel's Rüsselsheim plant, which had been the first major car plant in Germany to apply the assembly-line techniques pioneered by Henry Ford.

=== Soviet afterlife ===
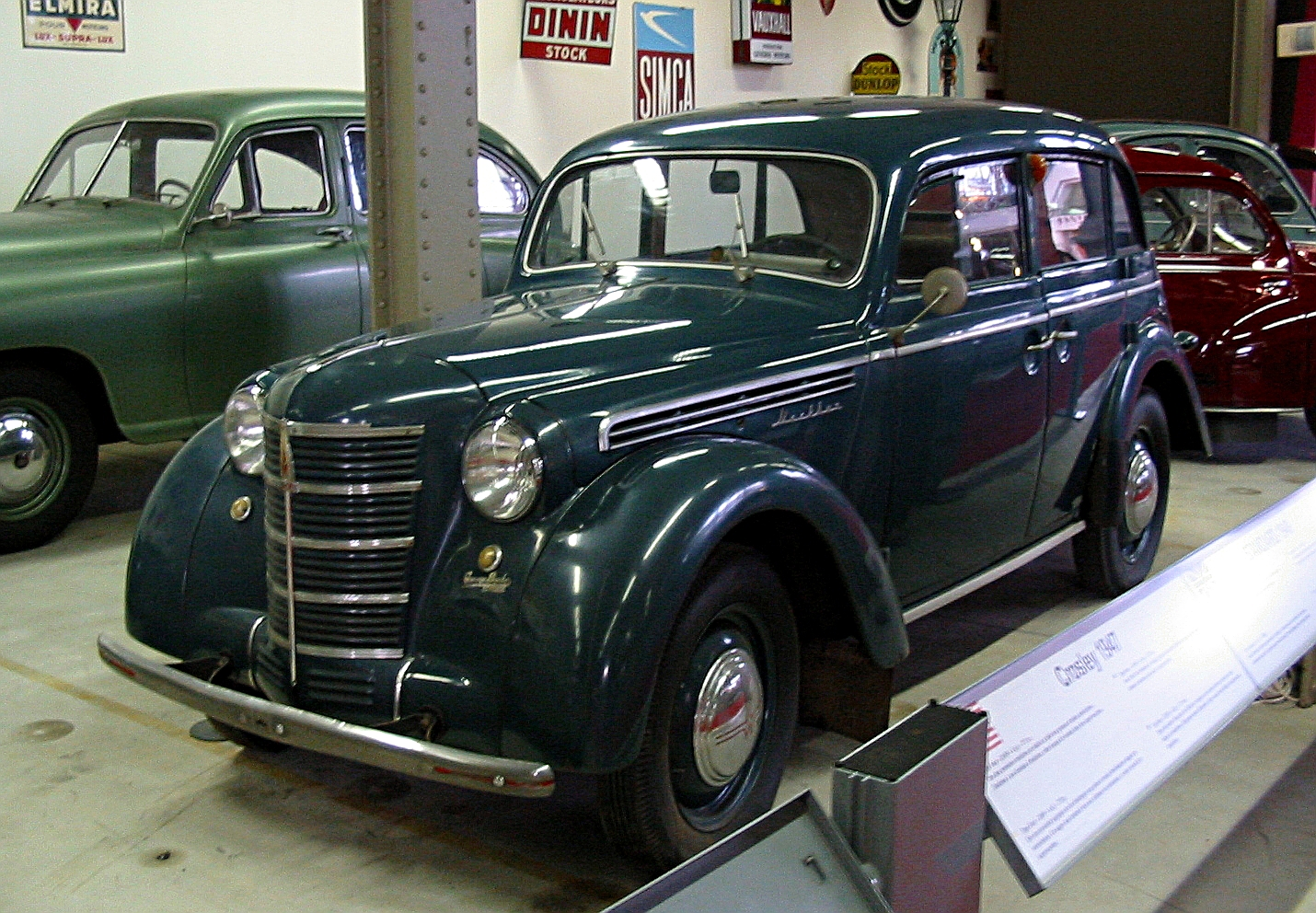
Moskvitch 400 (1947–1954)

After the Second World War, the Soviet Union requested the tooling from the Opel Rüsselsheim car plant in the American occupation zone as part of the war reparations agreed by the victorious powers, to compensate for the loss of the production lines for the domestic KIM-10-52 in the siege of Moscow. Faced with a wide range of German "small litrage" models to choose from, Soviet planners wanted a car that closely followed the general type of the KIM — a 4-door saloon with an all-metal body and 4-stroke engine. They, therefore, rejected both the rear-engined, two-door KdF-Wagen (future VW Beetle) and the two-stroke powered, front-wheel-drive, wooden-bodied DKW F8, built by the Auto Union Chemnitz plant in the Soviet occupation zone. The closest analog of the KIM to be found was the 4-door Kadett K38.

On 26 August 1945, the State Defense Committee published Order No. 9905, which prescribed the start of production of the 4-door Kadett on the Moscow small car plant "without any changes to the design". The implementation of the plan was far from smooth. The Rüsselsheim plant had been deeply involved in the Nazi war effort, producing aircraft engines for the Luftwaffe, and consequently has been heavily damaged by the Allied air raids. Very little was left to be salvaged – mostly incoherent drawings and plans, with several stamping dies for the 2-door version of the Kadett to add.

Still, a number of Kadetts had been captured as trophies by the Red Army and were available for study and reverse-engineering. This project was conducted by design bureaus formed as Soviet-German joint ventures under the Soviet Military Administration in Germany (SMAD). There were 11 of them in total. One in Berlin reverse-engineered the engine and transmission. Another in Schwarzenberg worked on the steel body. The wooden-bodied estate car was developed in Chemnitz. The vast majority of the personnel of these design bureaus were German specialists and craftsmen hired by the Military Administration. These design bureaus not only prepared the necessary blueprints and documentation, but also provided the wooden master model for the body. They even developed the new trim pieces which distinguished the Moskvitch from its Opel prototype, including hood emblems and hubcaps with a large "M" (for "Moskvitch"). However, the stamping dies and most of the tooling had to be produced in the USSR.

Production started on 4 December 1946. The Moskvitch 400/420 continued to be made in Moscow with some minor changes until 1956, when it was replaced by the Moskvitch 402. The latter was an all-new design apart from the engine, for which Moskvitch continued to use the Kadett side-valve engine until 1958, when it was replaced with a domestically designed OHV engine.

== Kadett A (1962–1965) ==
Kadett A
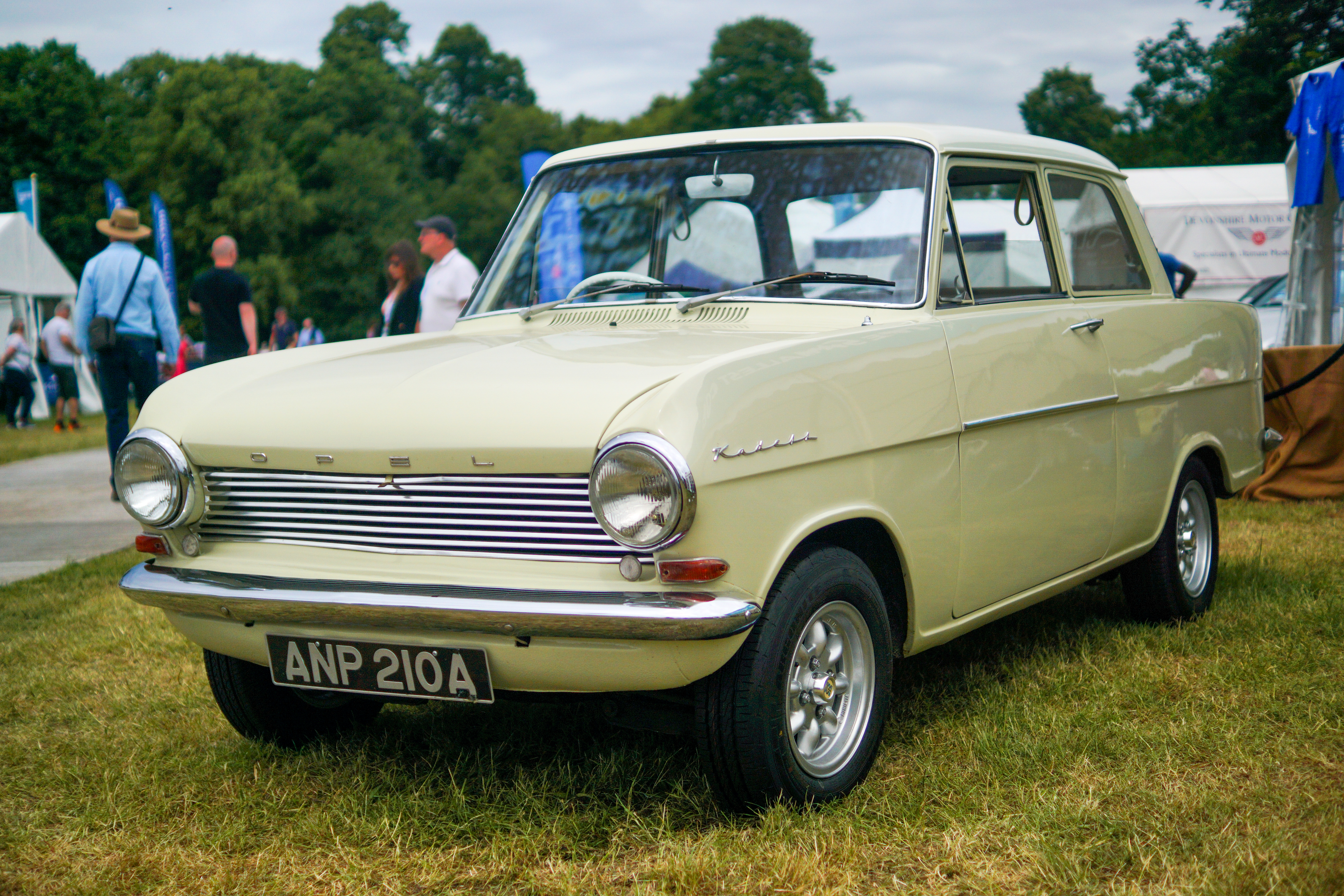

Overview
- Production: 1962–1965

Body and chassis
- Layout: Front-engine, rear-wheel-drive

Powertrain
- Engine: 993 cc Opel OHV OHV I4

The Kadett was reintroduced in 1962, with deliveries beginning on 2 October, a little more than 22 years after the original model was discontinued in May 1940. The new car (designated the Kadett A) was a small family car like its predecessor, although it was now available in two-door saloon, three-door estate ("Car-A-Van") and coupé versions.

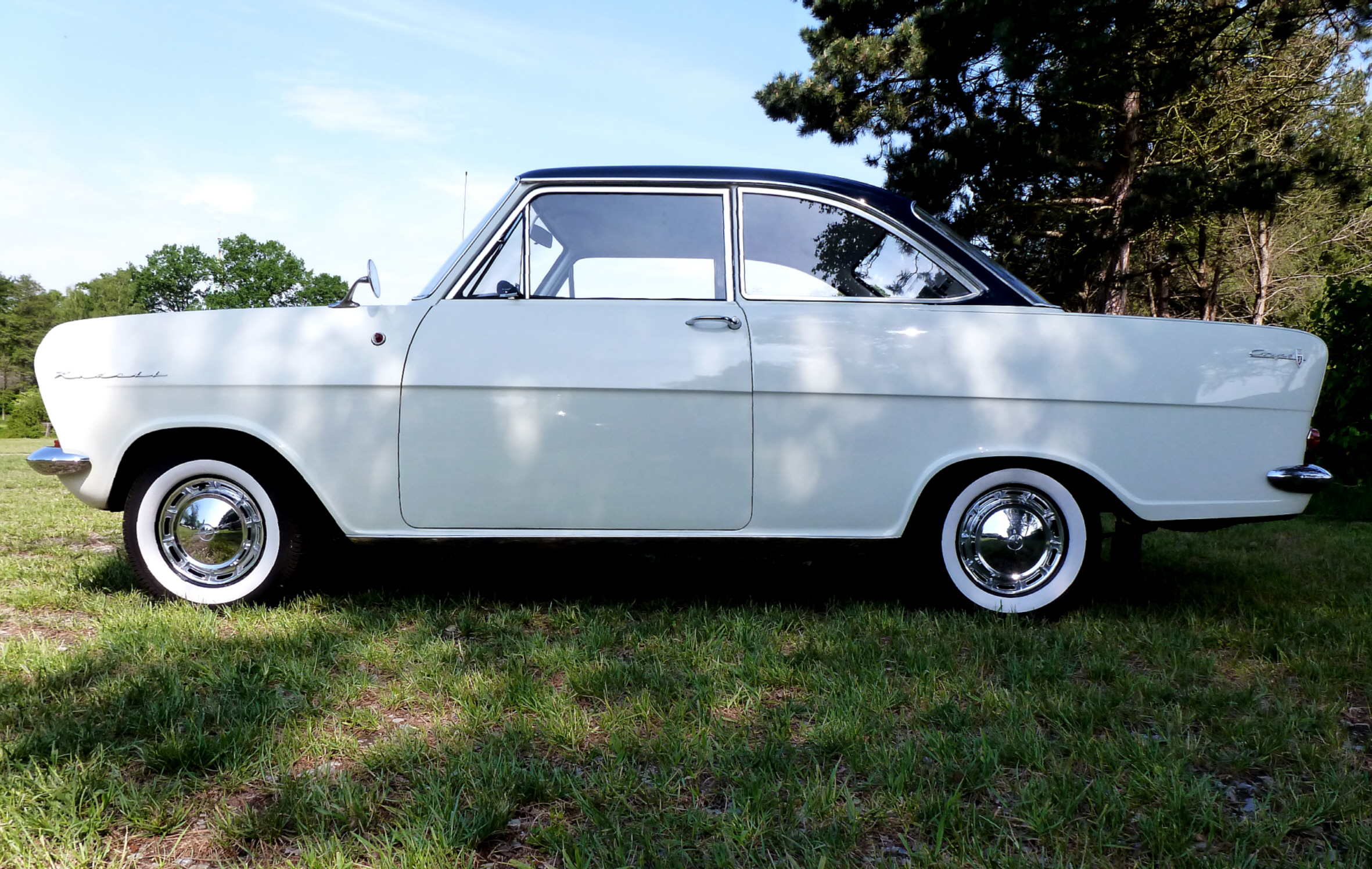
Opel Kadett Coupé (1962–1965)

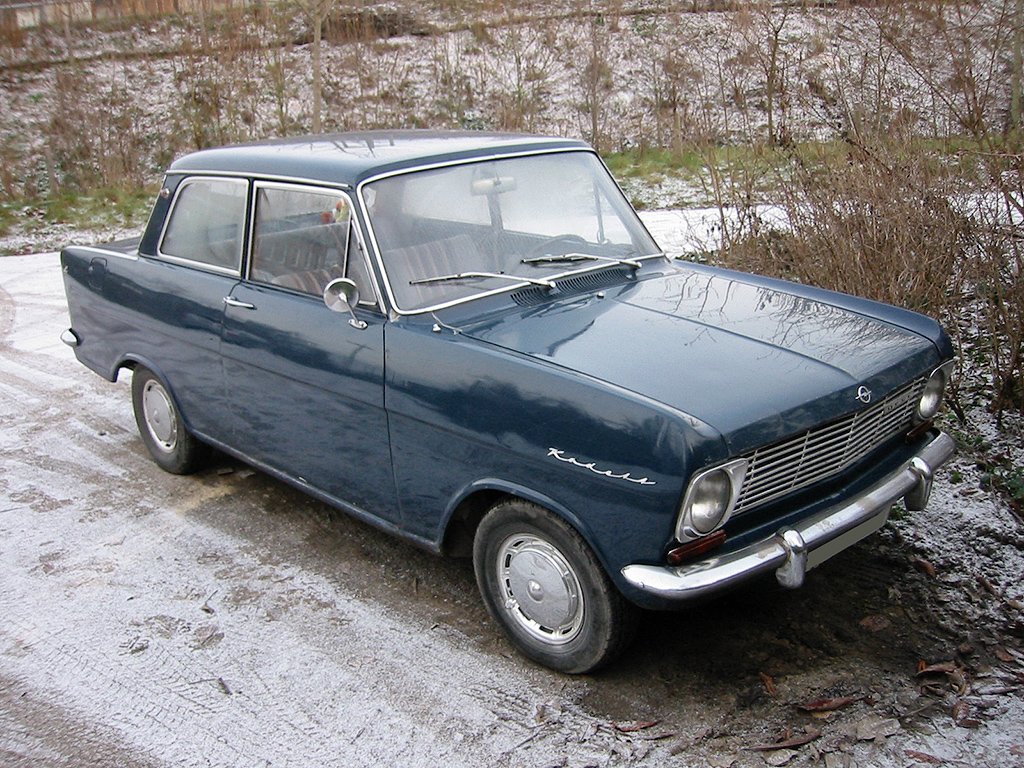
Opel Kadett L (1964–1965)

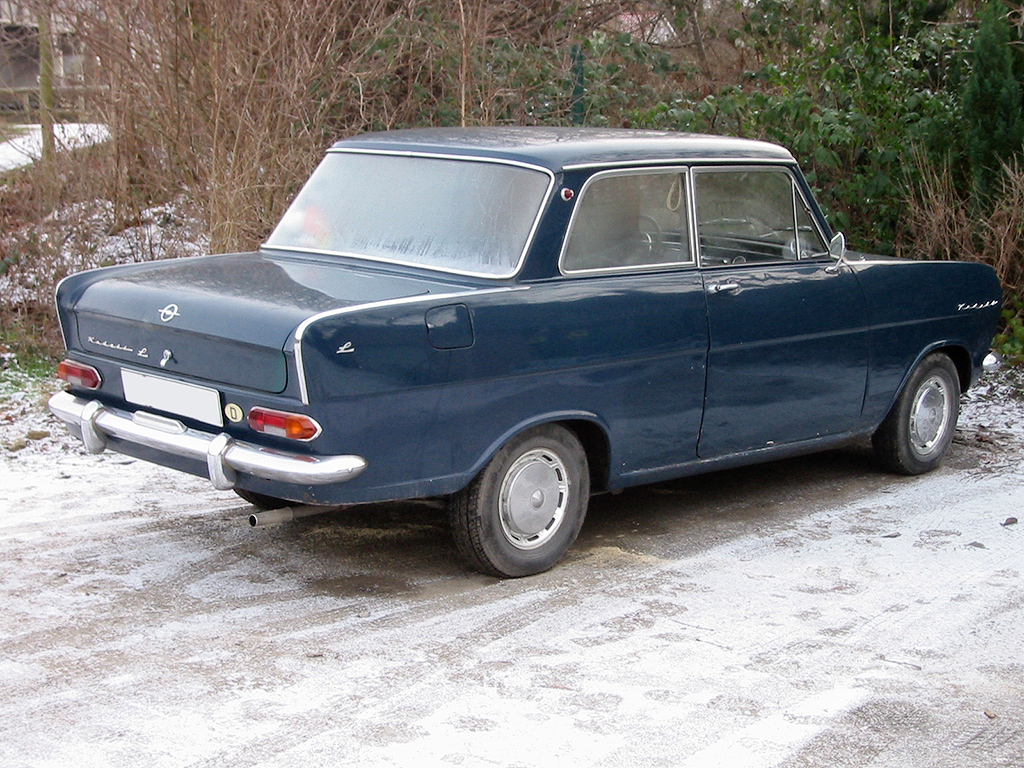
Rear

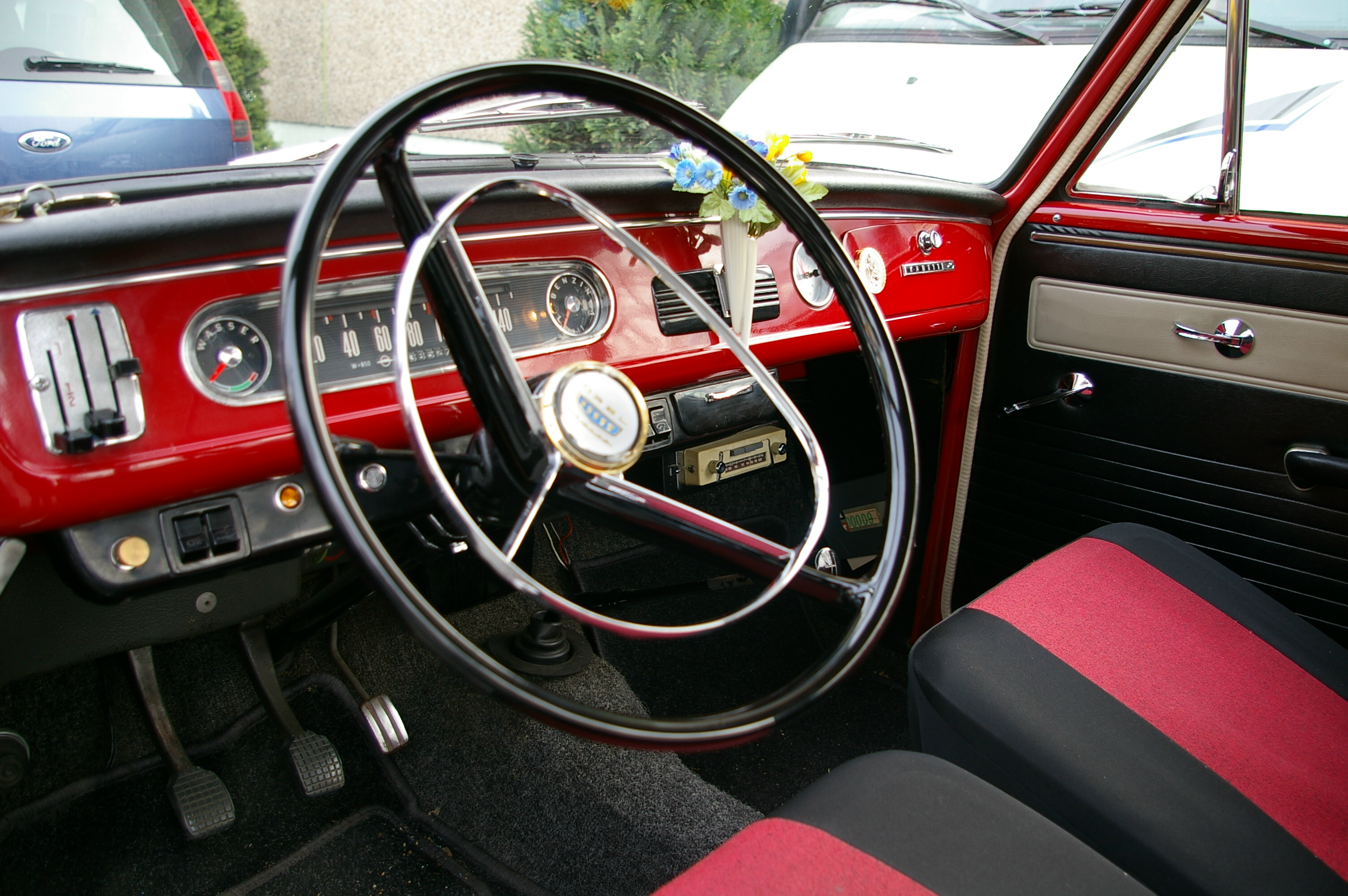
Dashboard

== Kadett B (1965–1973) ==
Kadett B
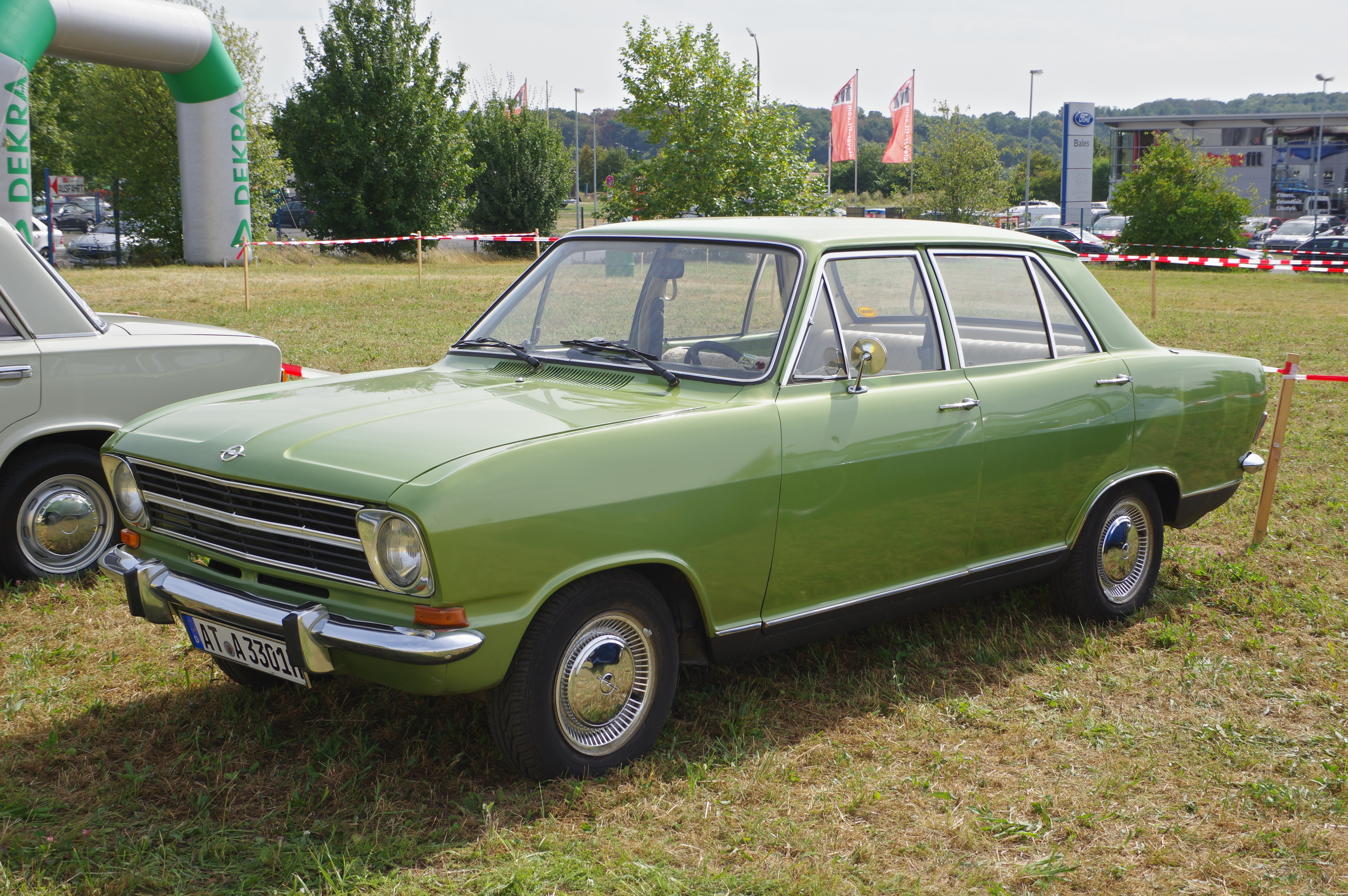
- Opel Kadett B 4-door Limousine

Overview
- Production: 1965–1973

Body and chassis
- Related: Opel Olympia A

The Kadett B was launched at the Frankfurt Motor Show in late summer 1965, The Kadett B was larger all-round than the Kadett A: 5% longer both overall and in terms of the wheelbase, 7% wider and 9% heavier (unladen weight), albeit 10 mm (0.39 in) lower in basic standard "Limousine" (saloon) form. Production ended in July 1973, with the successor model introduced a month later following the summer shutdown, in August. The two-seat Opel GT was heavily based on Kadett B components, its body made by a French contractor, Brissonneau & Lotz, at their Creil factory.

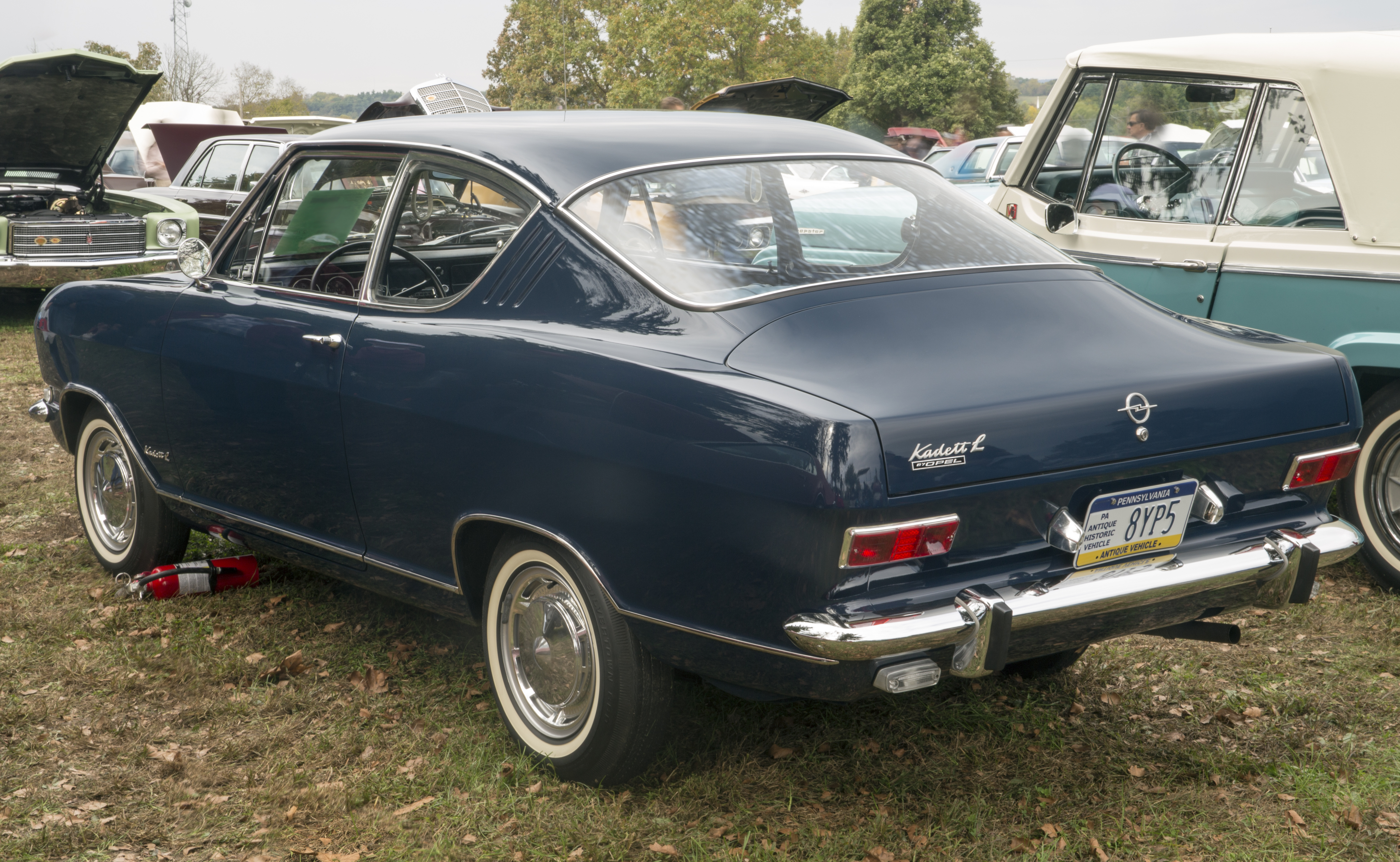
US-market Opel Kadett B "Gills-coupé" ("Kiemencoupé") (1965–1970)

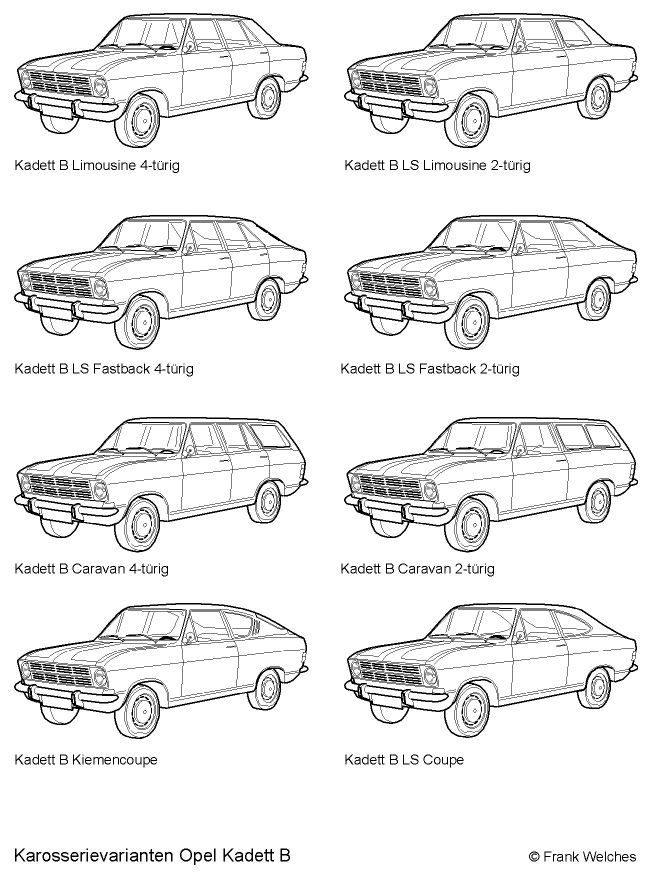
Opel Kadett B body options

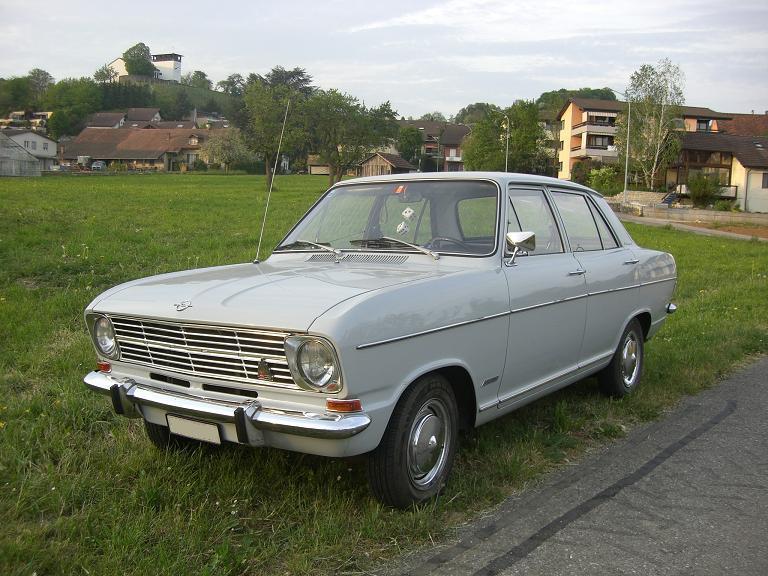
Opel Kadett B 4-door Limousine

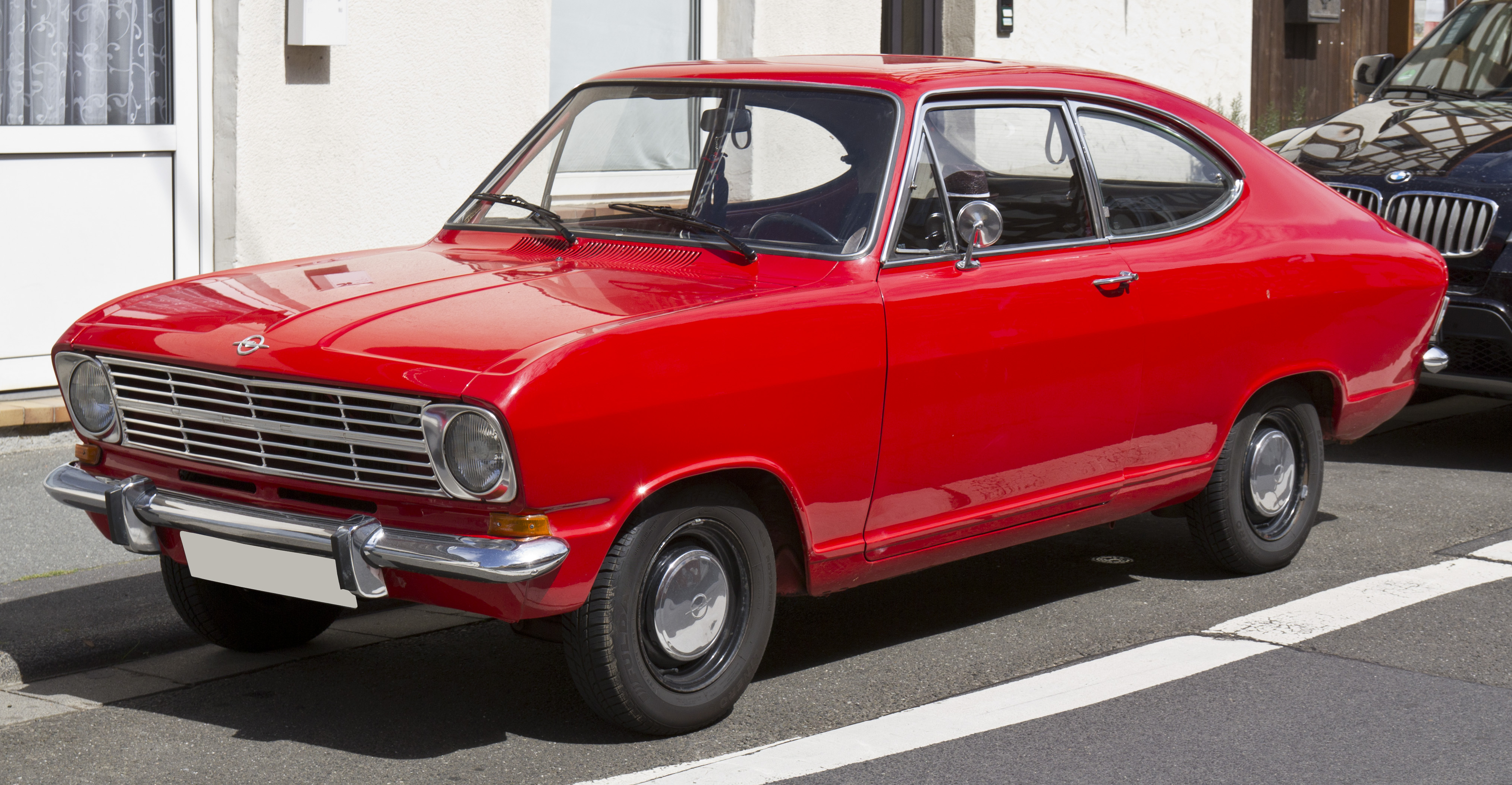
Opel Kadett B Coupé "F" (1967–1973)

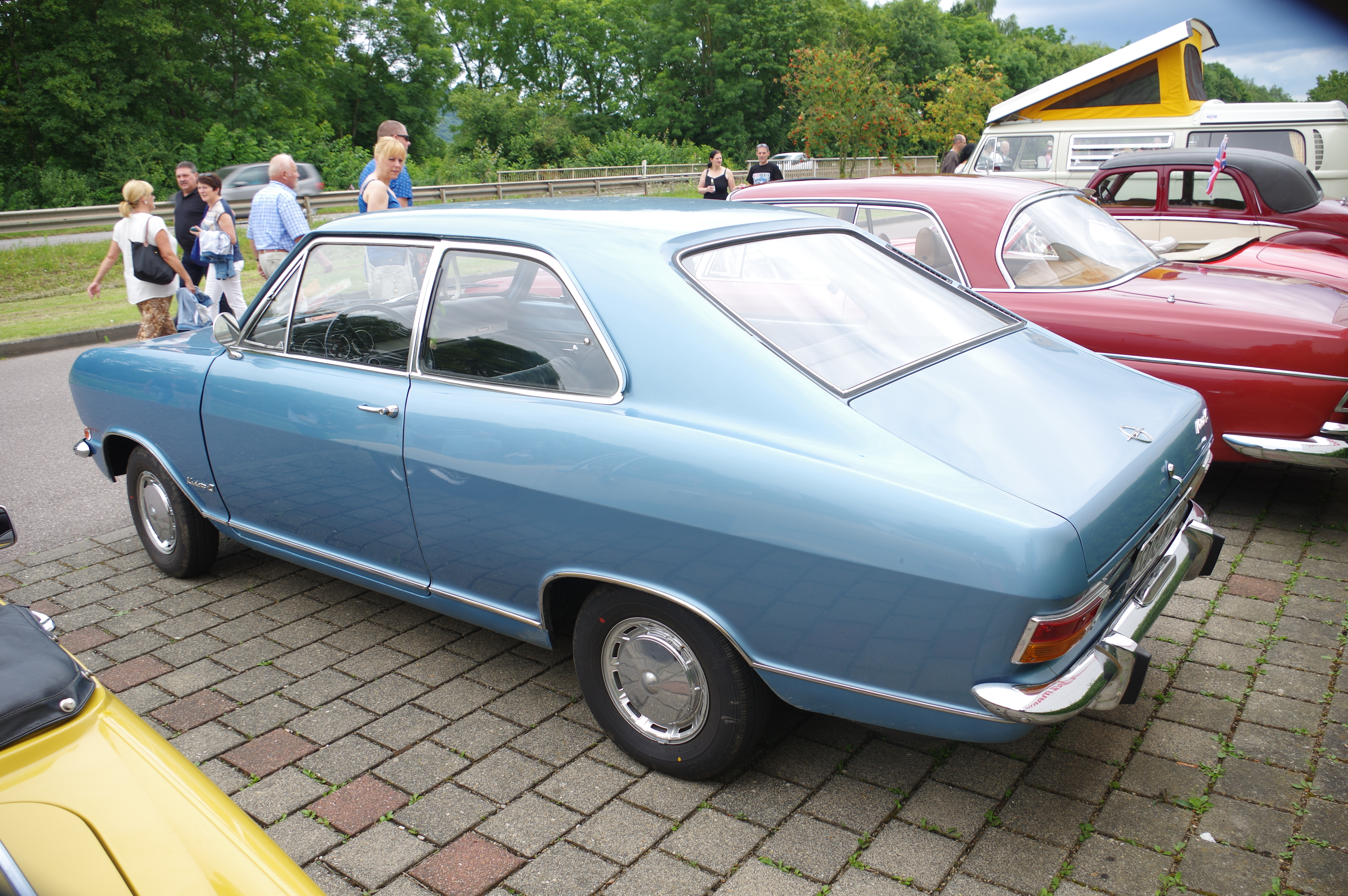
Opel Kadett B "LS" Fastback saloon (1967–1970)

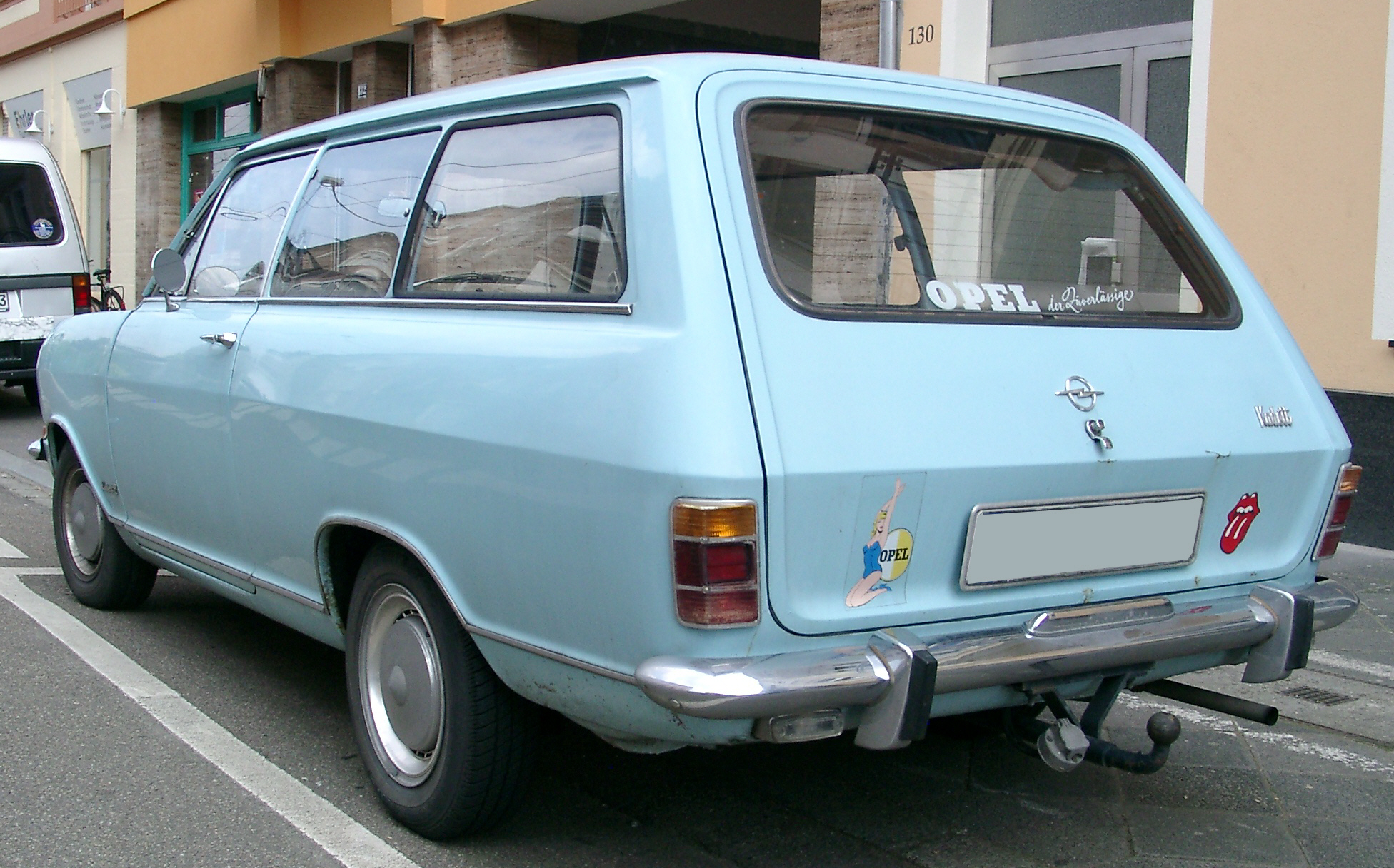
Rear-view of Opel Kadett B 3-door Caravan (Kombi) (1965–1973)

== Kadett C (1973–1979) ==
Kadett C
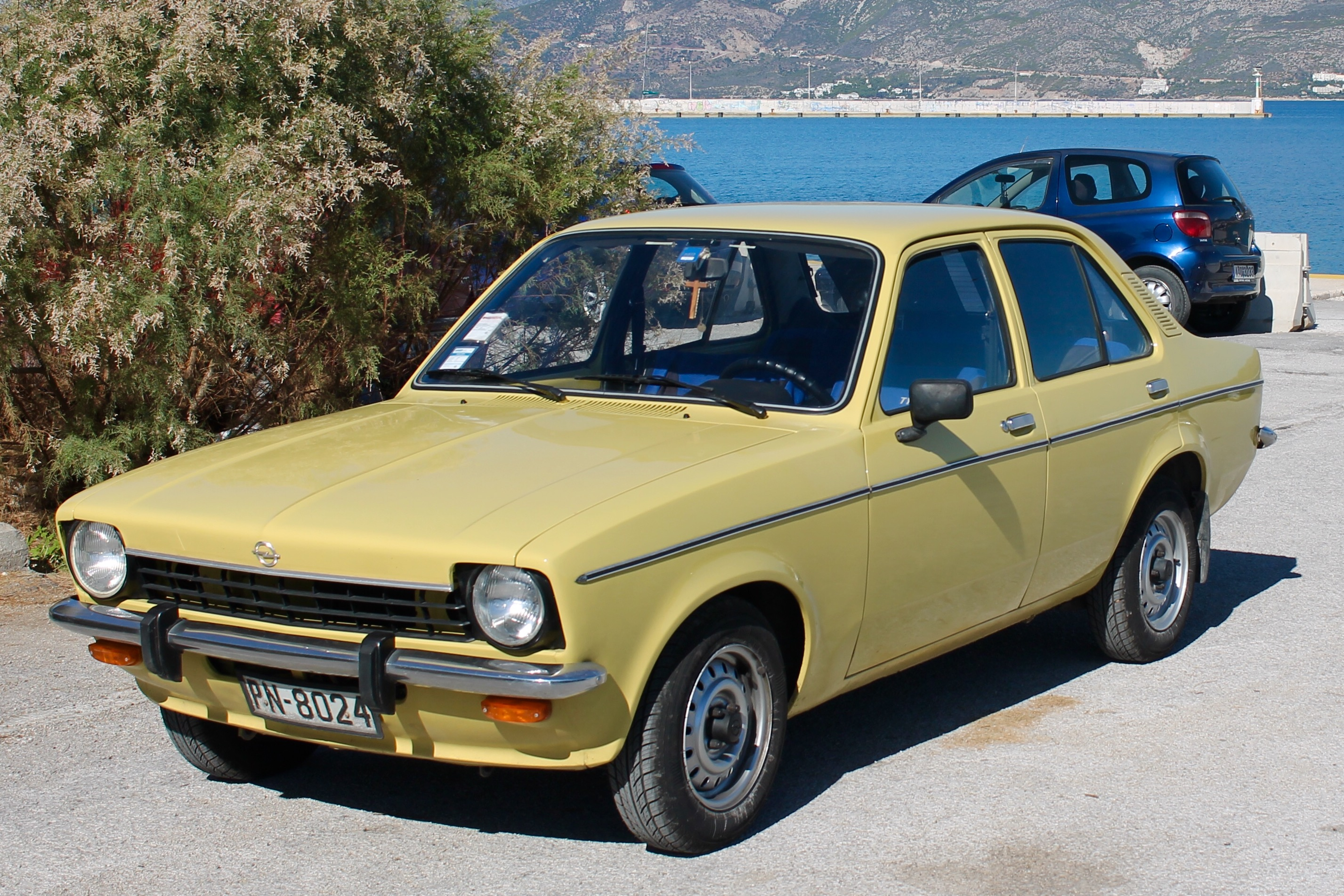

Overview
- Production: 1973–1979

Dimensions
- Wheelbase: 2,395 mm (94.3 in)

The Kadett C appeared in August 1973 and was Opel's version of the General Motors' "T-Car". It was the last small Opel to feature rear-wheel drive, and remained in production at Opel's Bochum plant until July 1979, by which time Opel had produced 1,701,076. Of these, 52% had been exported outside West Germany, most of them to markets in other parts of western Europe.

The Kadett C was mirrored in Europe by its British derivative — the Vauxhall Chevette. For the first time the Opel Kadett and its Vauxhall equivalent were now very clearly the same car, and marked the gradual convergence of Opel and Vauxhall models, which would be completed with the later Kadett D.

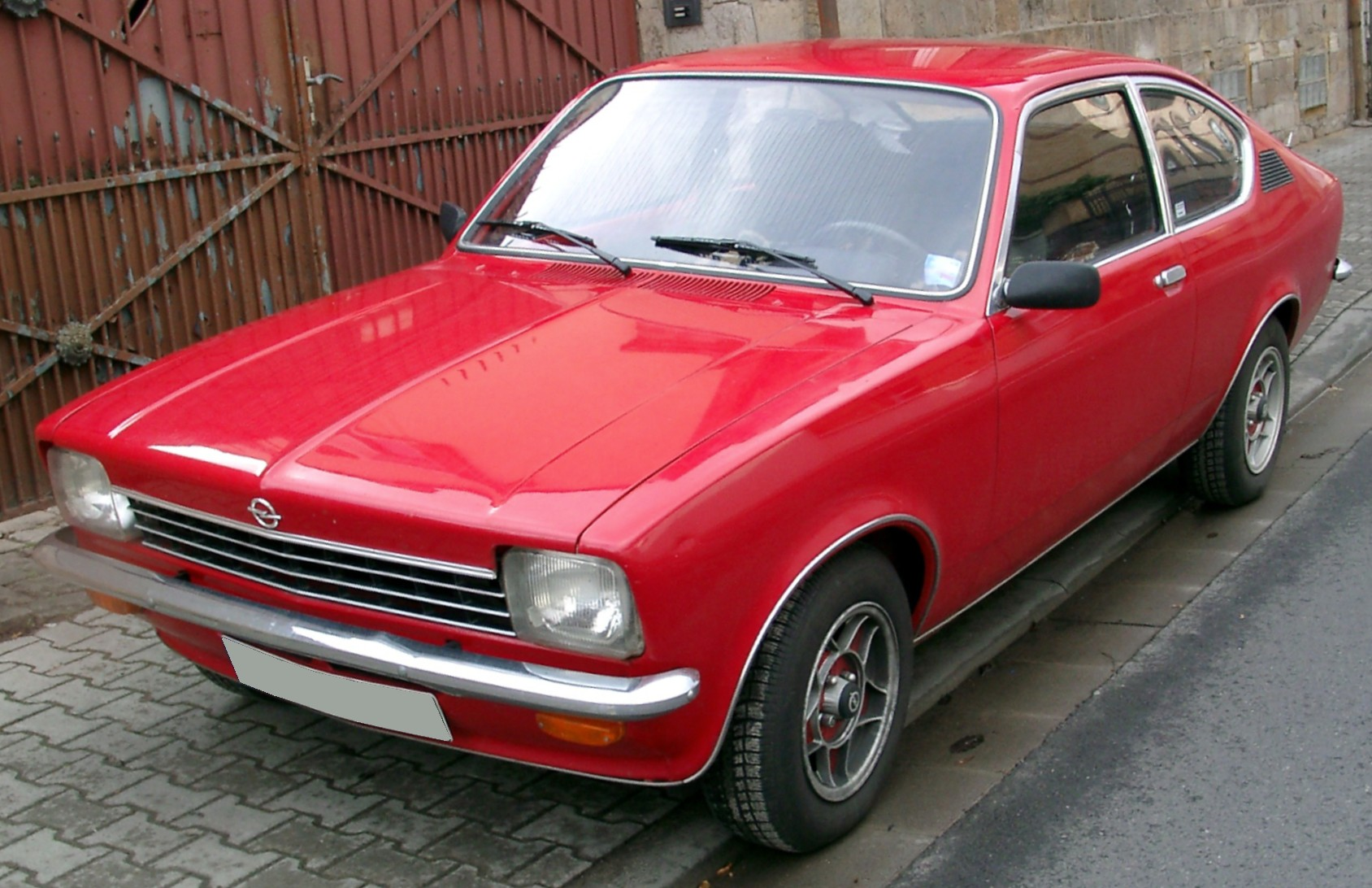
Opel Kadett Coupé (1973–1977)

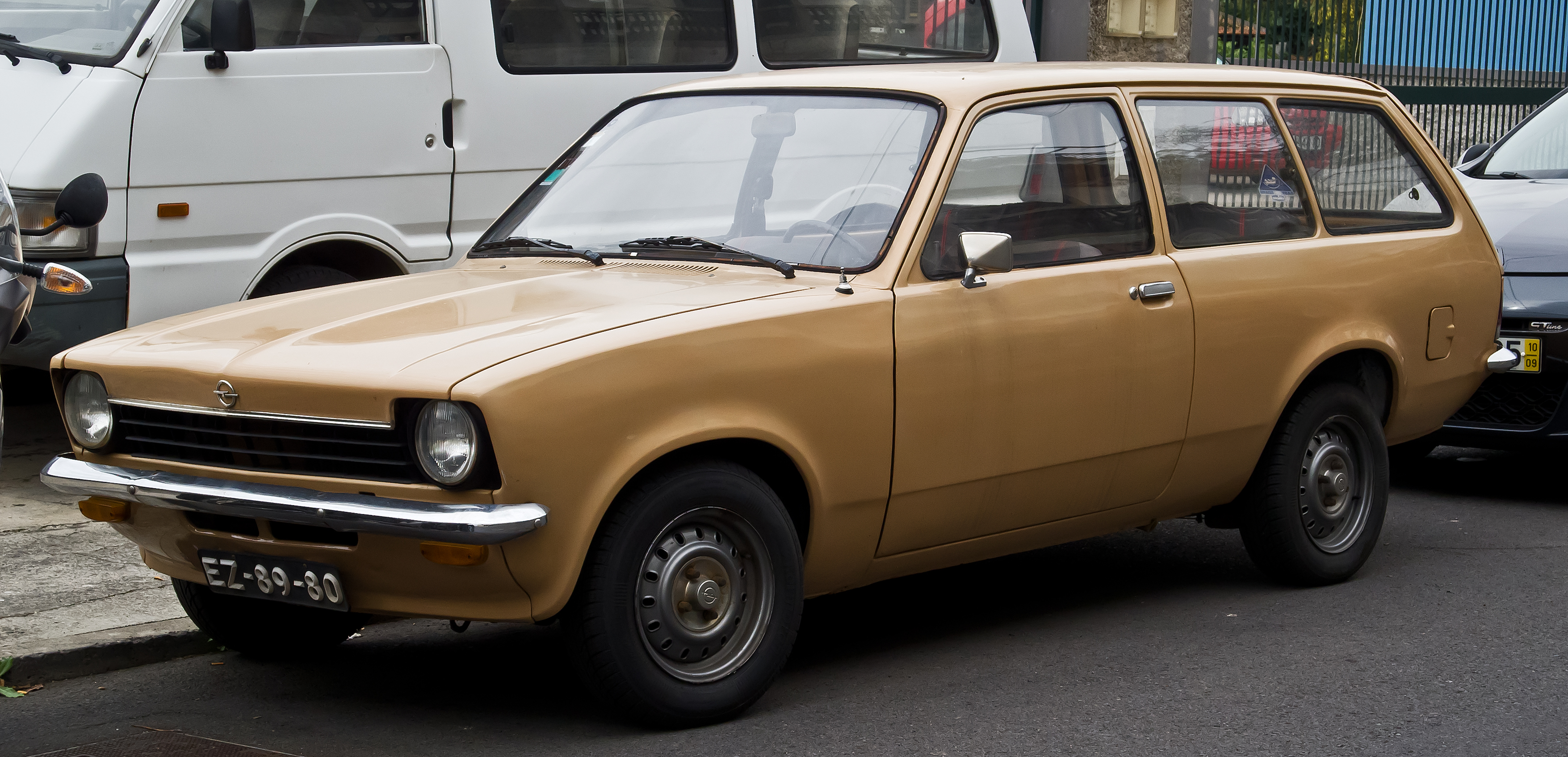
Opel Kadett Caravan (1973–1977)

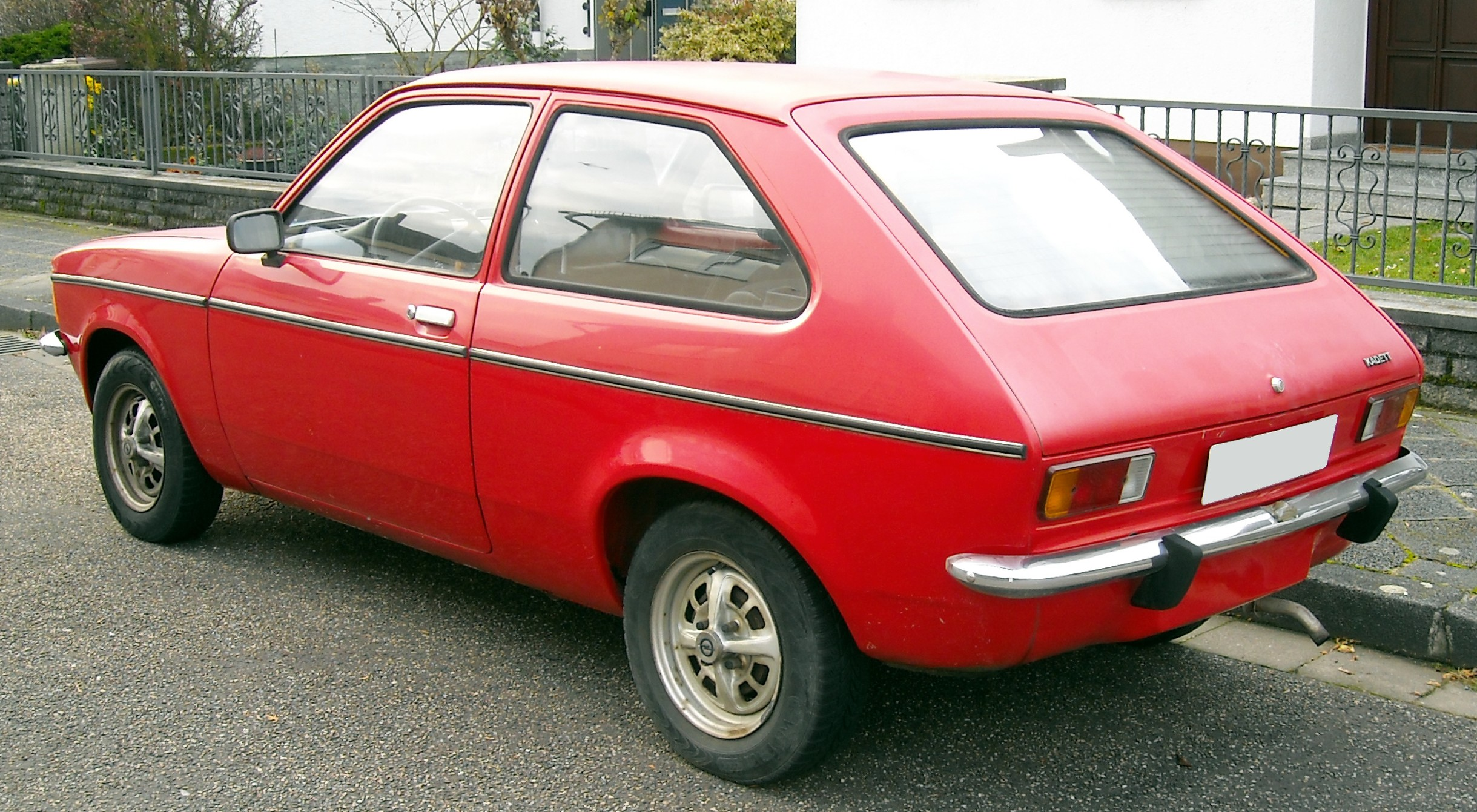
Rear-view of Opel Kadett "City"

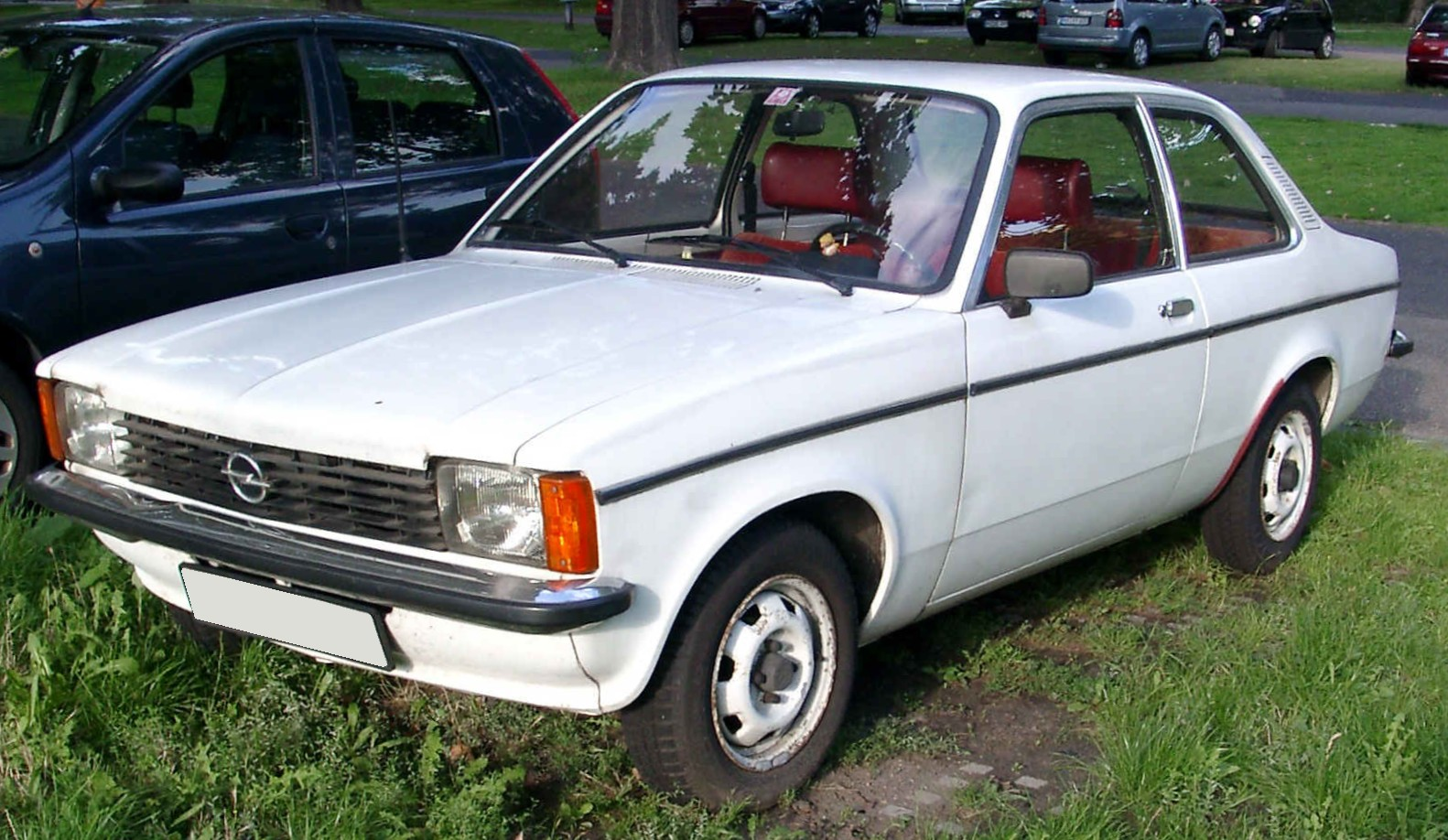
Opel Kadett C 2 door "Limousine" (post-1977 facelift)

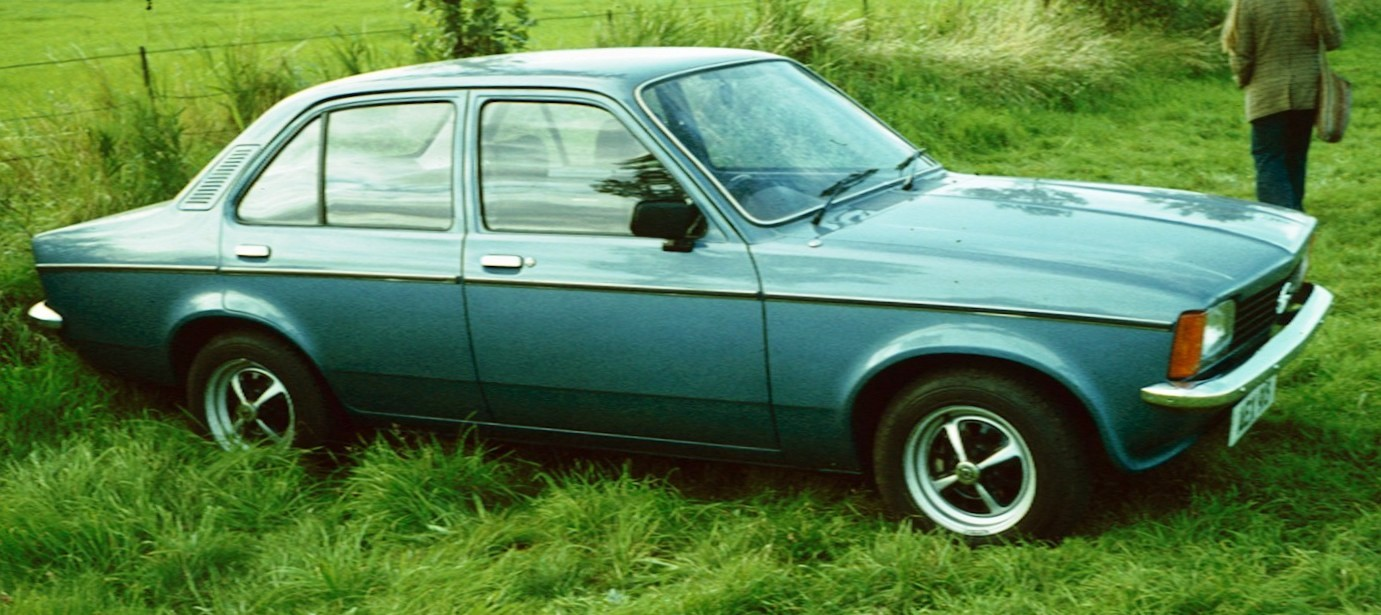
Opel Kadett C 4-door "Limousine"

== Kadett D (1979–1984) ==
Kadett D
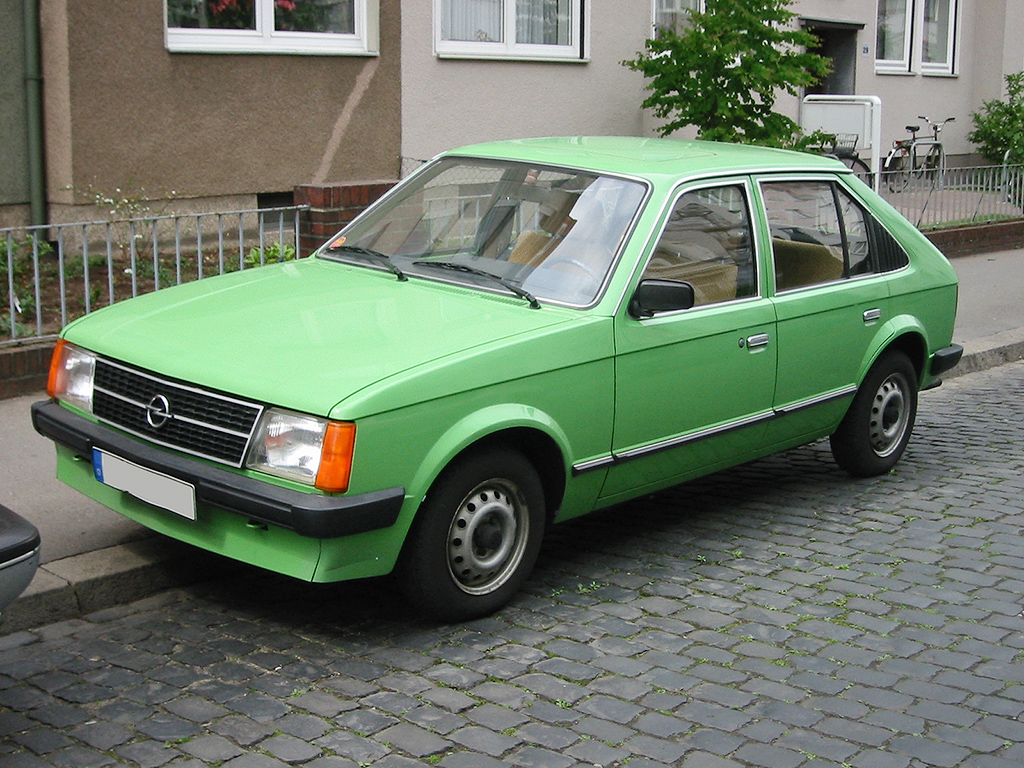

Overview
- Also called: Vauxhall Astra (United Kingdom), Bedford Astra (Van)
- Production: 1979–1984
- Assembly: Bochum, Germany; Antwerp, Belgium; Ellesmere Port, United Kingdom; Kikinda, Yugoslavia (IDA-Opel); Port Elizabeth, South Africa

Body and chassis
- Body style: 3- and 5-door hatchback; 2- and 4-door notchback saloon; 3- and 5-door wagon/estate (Caravan); 3-door panel van
- Layout: Transverse front-engine, front-wheel drive
- Platform: T-platform
- Related: Vauxhall Astra (United Kingdom)

Powertrain
- Engine: Petrol: 1.0 L Opel OHV I4; 1.2 L Opel OHV I4; 1.3 L Family 1 I4; 1.6 L Family II I4; 1.8 L Family II I4; Diesel: 1.6 L Family II I4
- Transmission: 4/5-speed manual; 3-speed automatic

Dimensions
- Wheelbase: 2,514 mm (99.0 in)
- Length: 3,998 mm (157.4 in); Caravan: 4,207 mm (165.6 in)
- Width: 1,636 mm (64.4 in)
- Height: 1,400 mm (55.1 in)
- Curb weight: 815–980 kg (1,796.8–2,160.5 lb)

The Kadett D was introduced in the middle of August 1979, with deliveries on the home market beginning early in September 1979. In November 1979, the car went on sale in the United Kingdom, some five months before the Vauxhall Astra Mark 1, the British version, was launched in March 1980. The cars were designed as three- or five-door hatchbacks and estates or estates. There were also two- and four-door saloons featuring separate boots/trunks, which shared the silhouettes of the hatchbacks: in the United Kingdom, the saloon versions were soon withdrawn, until the 1986 launch of the MKII-based Belmont. For the first time since 1965, there was no coupé-bodied Kadett in the range: the previous Kadett C coupé was indirectly replaced by the three-door 1.3 SR sports model.

Technologically, the Kadett D was part of a major investment for Opel (and General Motors as a whole) in a new front-wheel drive architecture, with an all-new family of engines and transmissions which would later be applied in the larger Ascona C and the smaller Corsa A in 1981, and 1982, respectively. It was also the first application of the Family I engine, with a single overhead camshaft, aluminium-alloy cylinder head, hydraulic valve lifters, with capacities of 1297 cc (producing 60 PS and 75 PS) and had a transaxle design that allowed the clutch to be replaced without removing the transmission unit. A carry-over 1196 cc Opel OHV engine from previous generations of the Kadett producing 55 PS (40 kW) and a top speed of 140 km/h (87 mph) was also offered on entry-level models from launch. The larger Family II engine debuted in 1600 cc form and was offered after Frankfurt 1981, followed by an 1800 cc version introduced for the Kadett GSE/Astra GTE model. The Kadett D was also equipped with a 1600 cc diesel engine, an option which was first presented at the Brussels Motor Show in 1982. Another frugal model, mostly sold in Italy, was the 1.0 liter model with 50 PS (37 kW).

This range of engines was also used for later models of the Corsa/Nova, and the mid-sized Cavalier/Ascona. From May 1981, the 1.3 was also available with a three-speed automatic. The automatic was made available to the diesel in September 1982. In the United Kingdom, Opels and Vauxhalls were initially sold through separate marketing operations, with overlapping lineups that competed directly with each other. By 1982 this anomaly had been sorted out and the Opel lineup was limited to the well-equipped five-door Berlina (1.3S or 1.6S) and the sporty 1.6 SR, leaving most of the market to the Vauxhall-badged cars.

One interesting version which first appeared in mid-1982 was the Kadett Pirsch, (for deer stalking, a stealthy form of hunting). In non-German-speaking countries it was generally marketed as the "Kadett Off Road." This was an estate car with rustic trim, fitted with a limited-slip differential, reinforced suspension and more suitable tires, increased ground clearance, a skid plate, and shortened front fenders. In Sweden, a special postal Kadett ("Opel Kadett Post") was offered, fitted with a high roof (necessitating a unique and much taller windshield) and a sliding right-hand door, RHD, and the automatic transmission. This version was converted by Karosseriefabrik Voll (in German) in Würzburg, Germany. Voll also made a postal version of the later Kadett E.

The Kadett D was also sold as the IDA Kadett and assembled Kikinda, Yugoslavia. In Indonesia, PT. Garmak Motor was also reproduced Kadett D after 1984 in Jakarta, only for local market general buyers and taxi fleets until around 1995. It was later replaced by Opel Optima (Astra F) saloon. Only available as a 5-door hatchback, with carburetted 1298 cc GM Family 1 engine and 5-speed manual transmission.

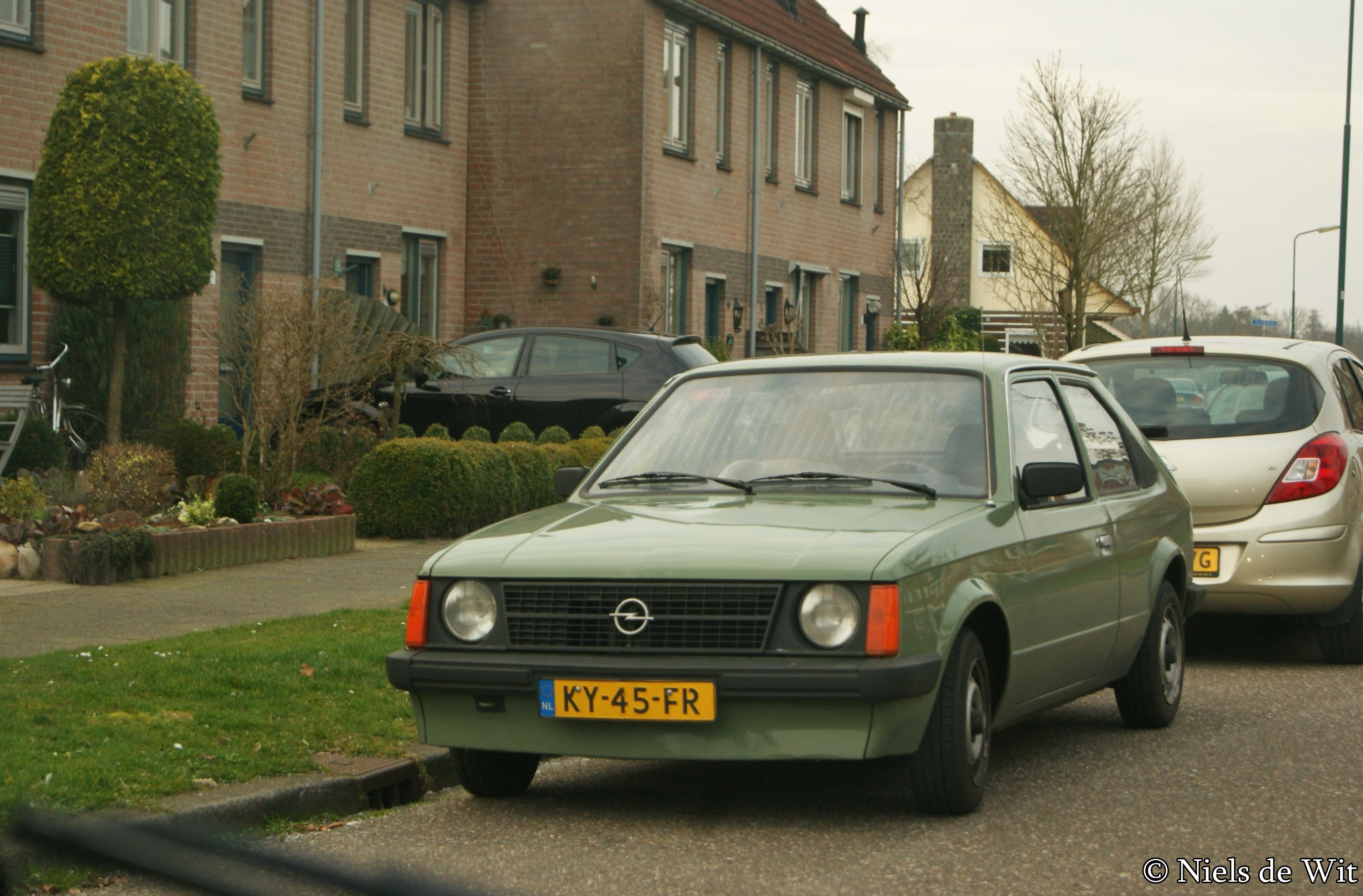
Base model Kadett D hatchback/saloon with round headlights and different front grille

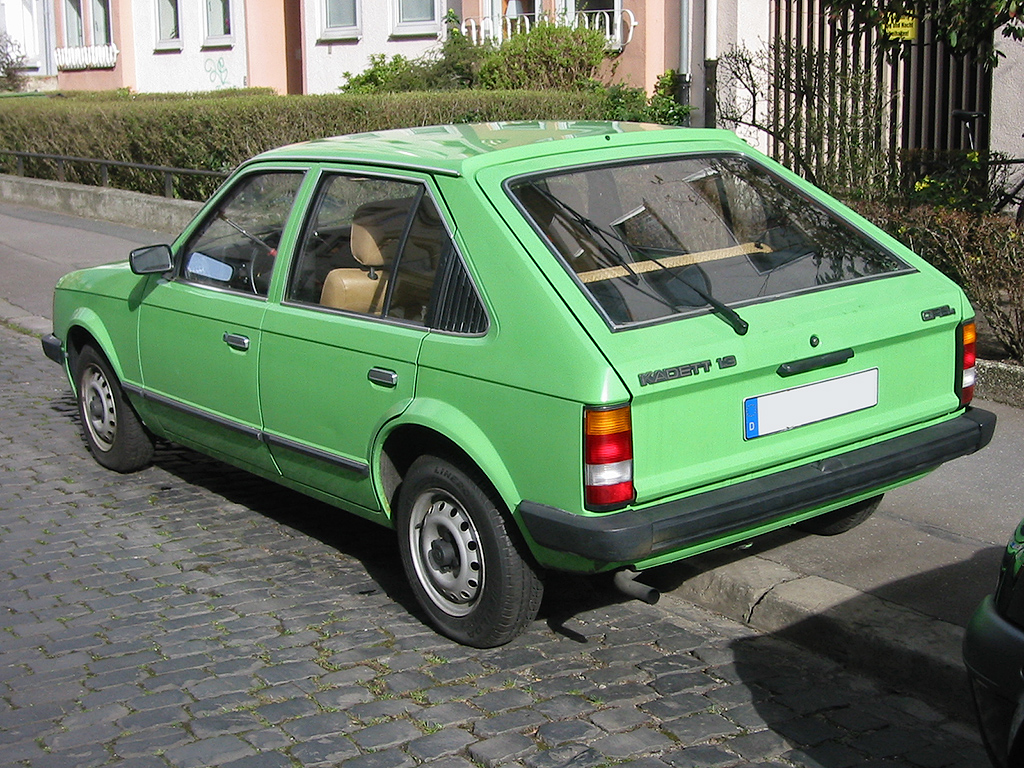
Opel Kadett D hatchback five-door

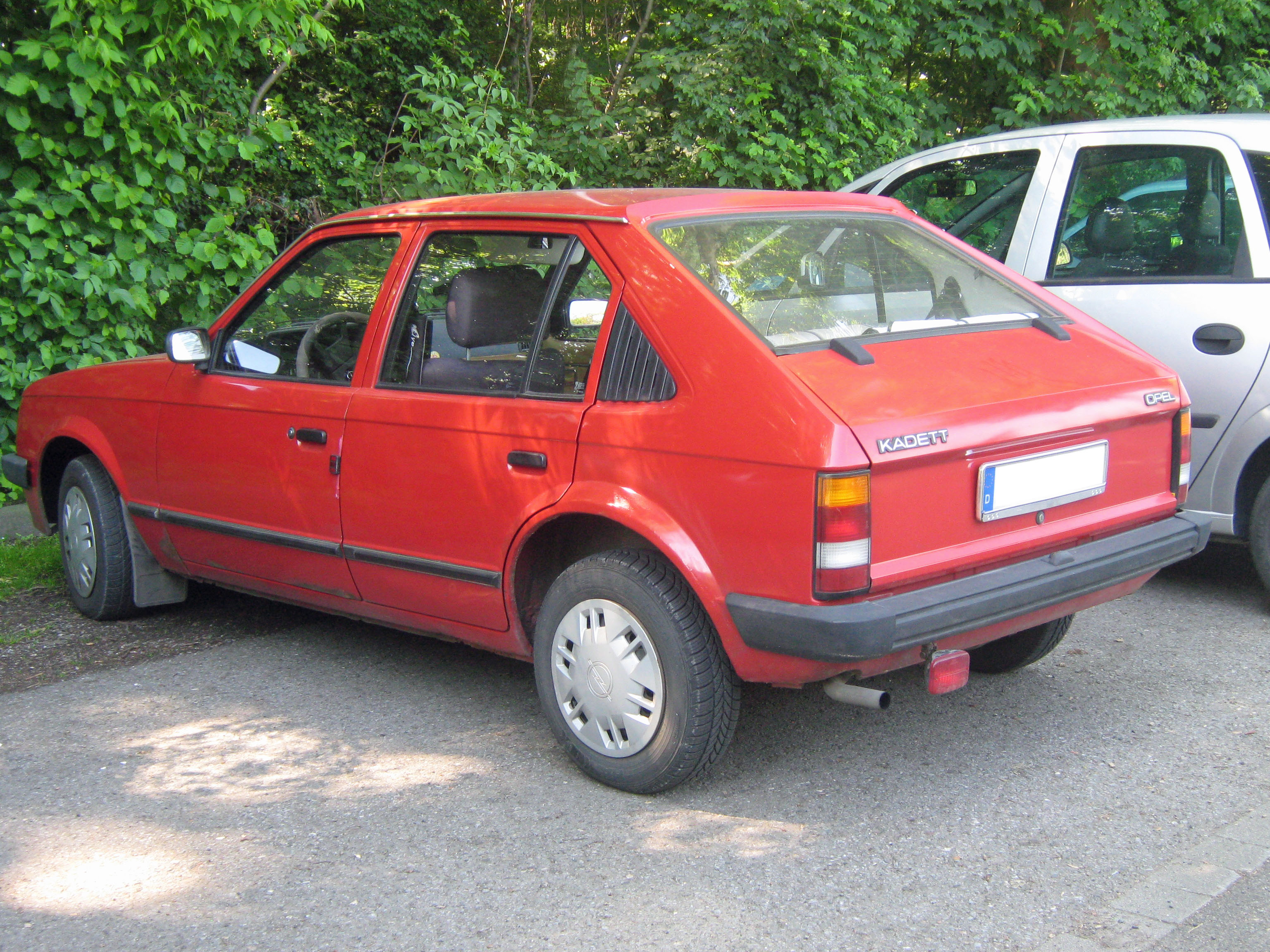
Kadett D saloon four-door

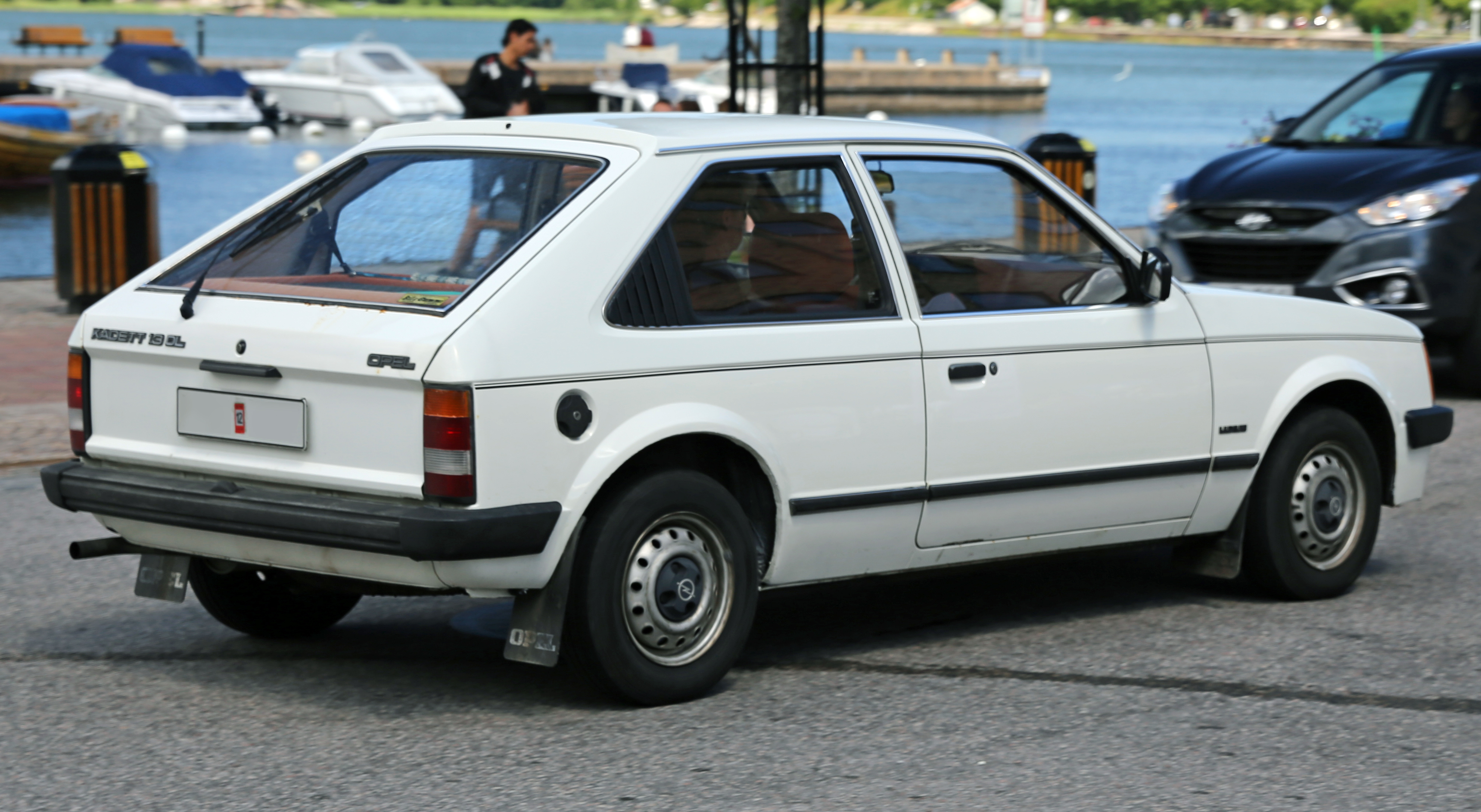
Kadett D hatchback three-door

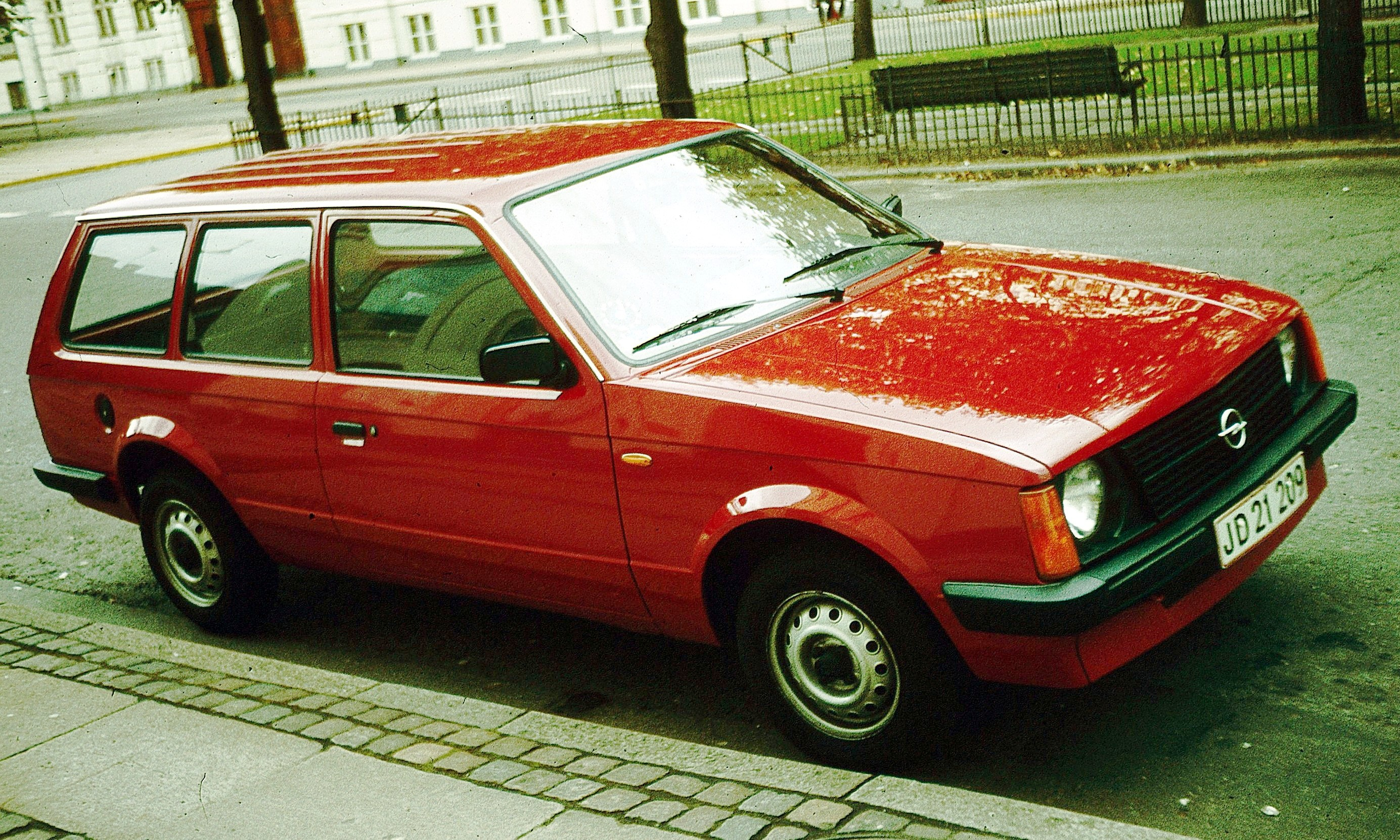
Base model Kadett D Caravan with round headlights and different front grille

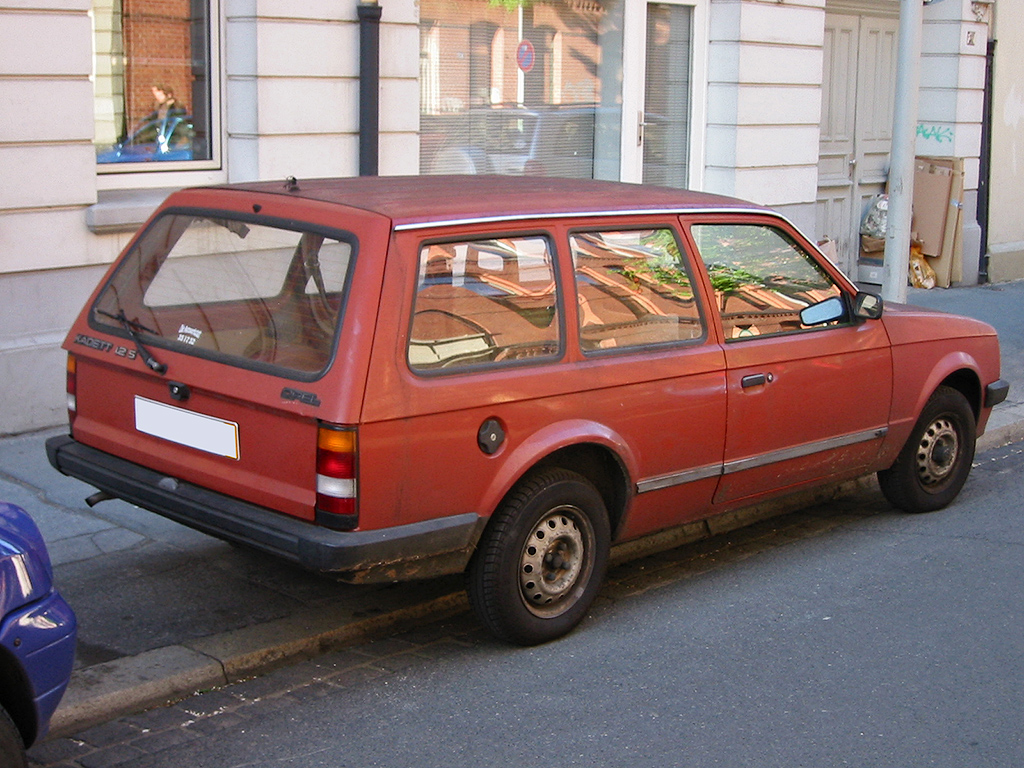
Opel Kadett D Caravan three-door

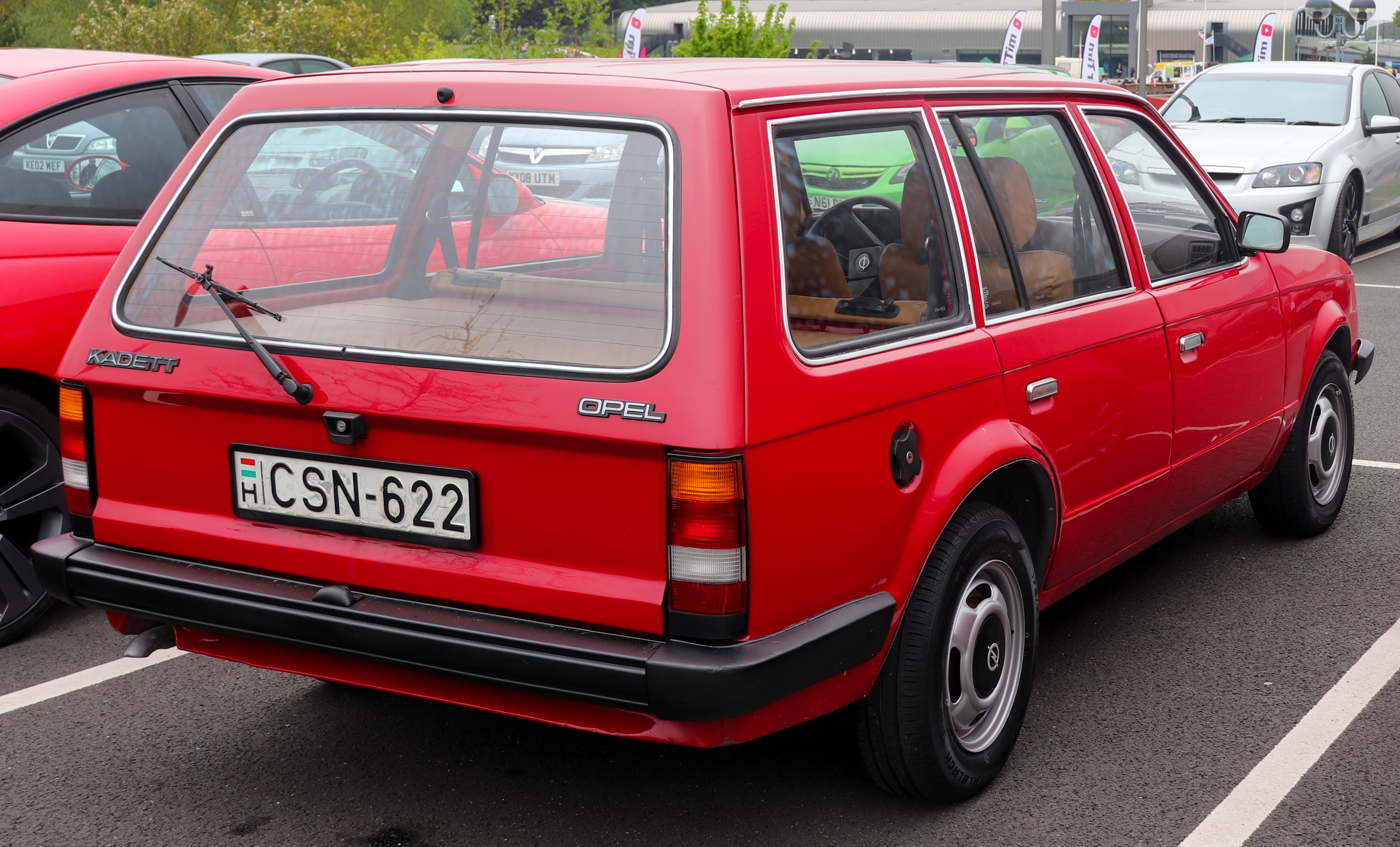
Kadett D Caravan five-door

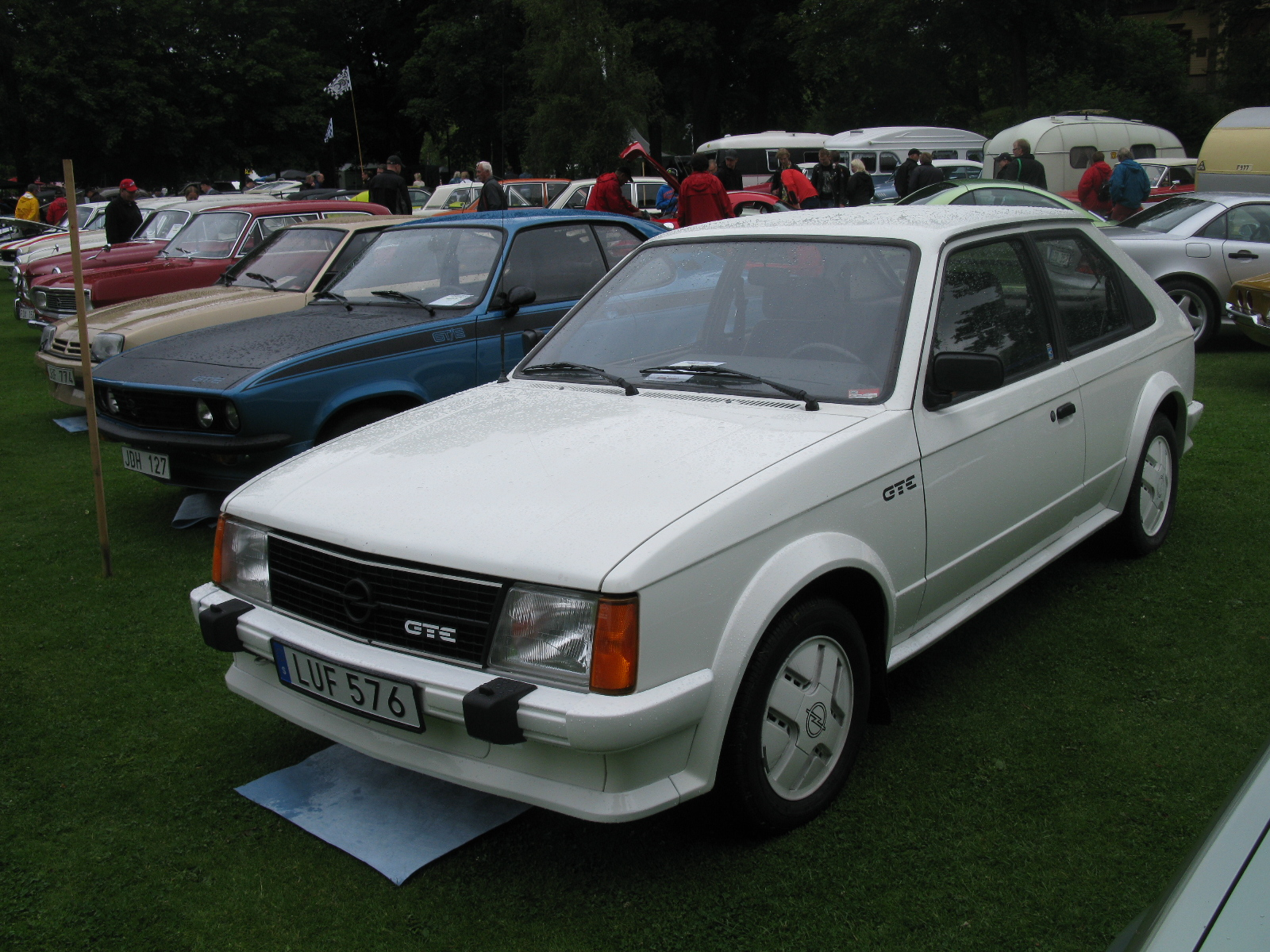
The fuel injected Kadett GTE

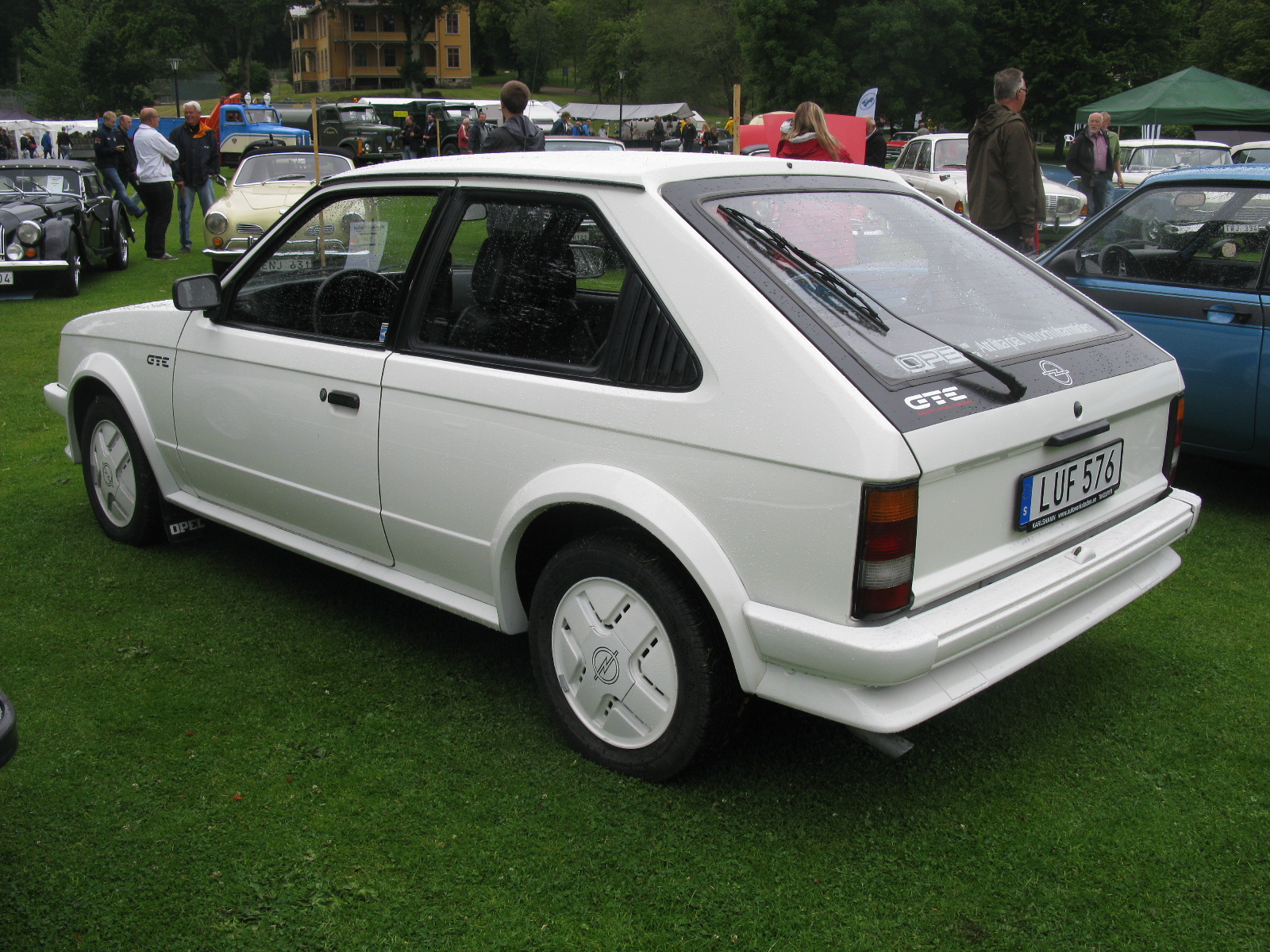
Rear view of Kadett D GTE hatchback three-door

=== Models ===
Kadett 1979 (Netherlands)	3dr hatch	5dr hatch	2dr saloon	4dr saloon	3dr caravan	5dr caravan	Panel van
Basic	●	●	●	●	●	●	
Luxus	●	●	●	●	●	●	
Berlina	●	●	●	●			
SR	●		●				

=== South Africa ===
The Opel Kadett D was also built in South Africa by General Motors South African (Pty) Ltd. The South African range was made up of four-door fastback saloons, five-door hatchbacks, and a five-door estate model called the Voyage. The engines used are Opel's 1.2-litre overhead valve inline-four (L models only), or the OHC 1.3-litre (GL, GLS, and Voyage). Power is 60 PS (44 kW) and 75 PS (55 kW) respectively. Later a 1.6 L was added and also a 1.8 L in the GTE performance model.

Small engine sizes with round lights on the nose while large engine sizes would have square lights on the nose.

== Kadett E (1984–1995) ==
Kadett E
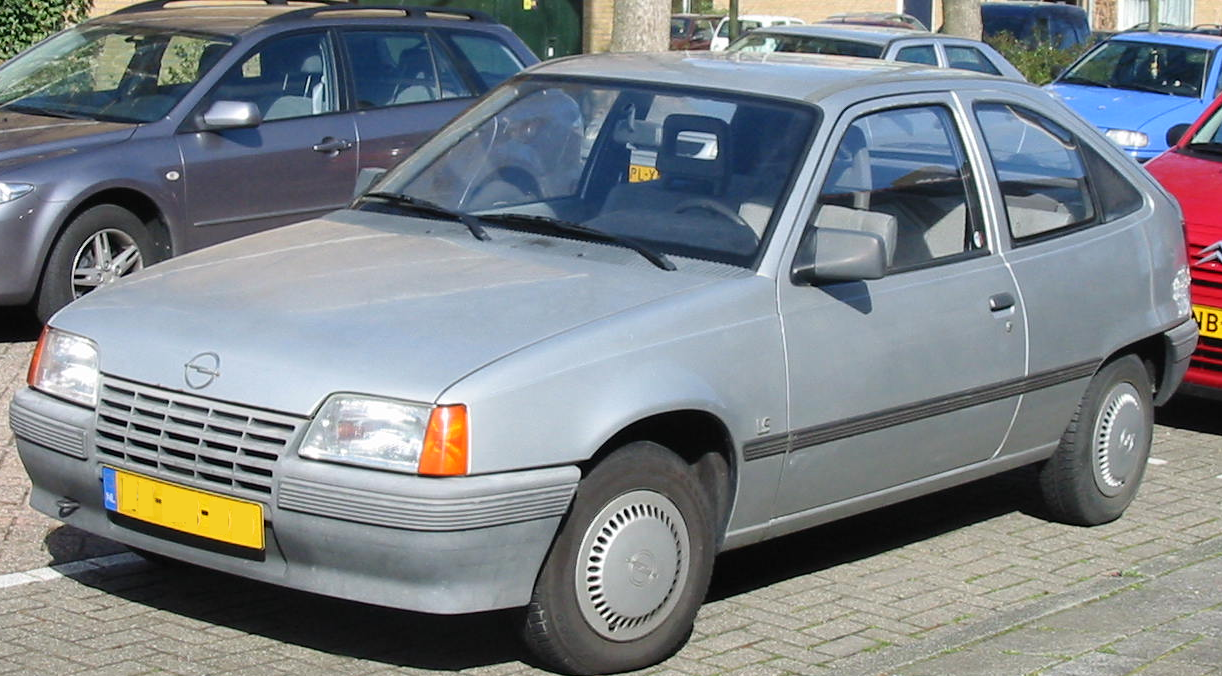
- Pre-facelift Kadett 1.3 LS (1987)

Overview
- Production: 1984–1995

Body and chassis
- Platform: T-platform
- Related: Opel Kadett Combo; Daewoo LeMans

The Kadett E (sold as the Vauxhall Astra Mark 2 in the United Kingdom) was introduced in August 1984, and was voted the 1985 European Car of the Year. The 1984 model was also developed into a more conventional three-box design with a boot (trunk), badged as the Vauxhall Belmont in the United Kingdom, launched at Frankfurt 1985. There was an estate car called the "Caravan" in mainland Europe, available with either three or five doors, as well as a convertible built by Bertone in Italy (from 1987). There was also a van version with a raised roof, called the Opel Kadett Combo in Europe, and the Bedford Astramax in the United Kingdom.

The car was noted for its advanced aerodynamics and distinctive "teardrop" shape — mirroring the trend in the mid 1980s for swooping aerodynamic styling — with the front end styling taken directly from the Opel Tech 1 concept car of 1981, although some styling cues from the Kadett D were retained for continuity such as its 'Kamm tail' and oversized C-pillar extraction vent. This generation was built and sold as the Chevrolet Kadett in Brazil, while the estate car was called the Chevrolet Ipanema. The Kadett E formed the basis of the Daewoo LeMans (later known as the Daewoo Cielo, Racer and Nexia) in South Korea, Nexia being the hatchback version), which was sold in the United States and New Zealand as the Pontiac LeMans, and in Canada (initially) as the Passport Optima. The Nexia was produced until 2016 at the UzDaewoo plant in Asaka, Uzbekistan.

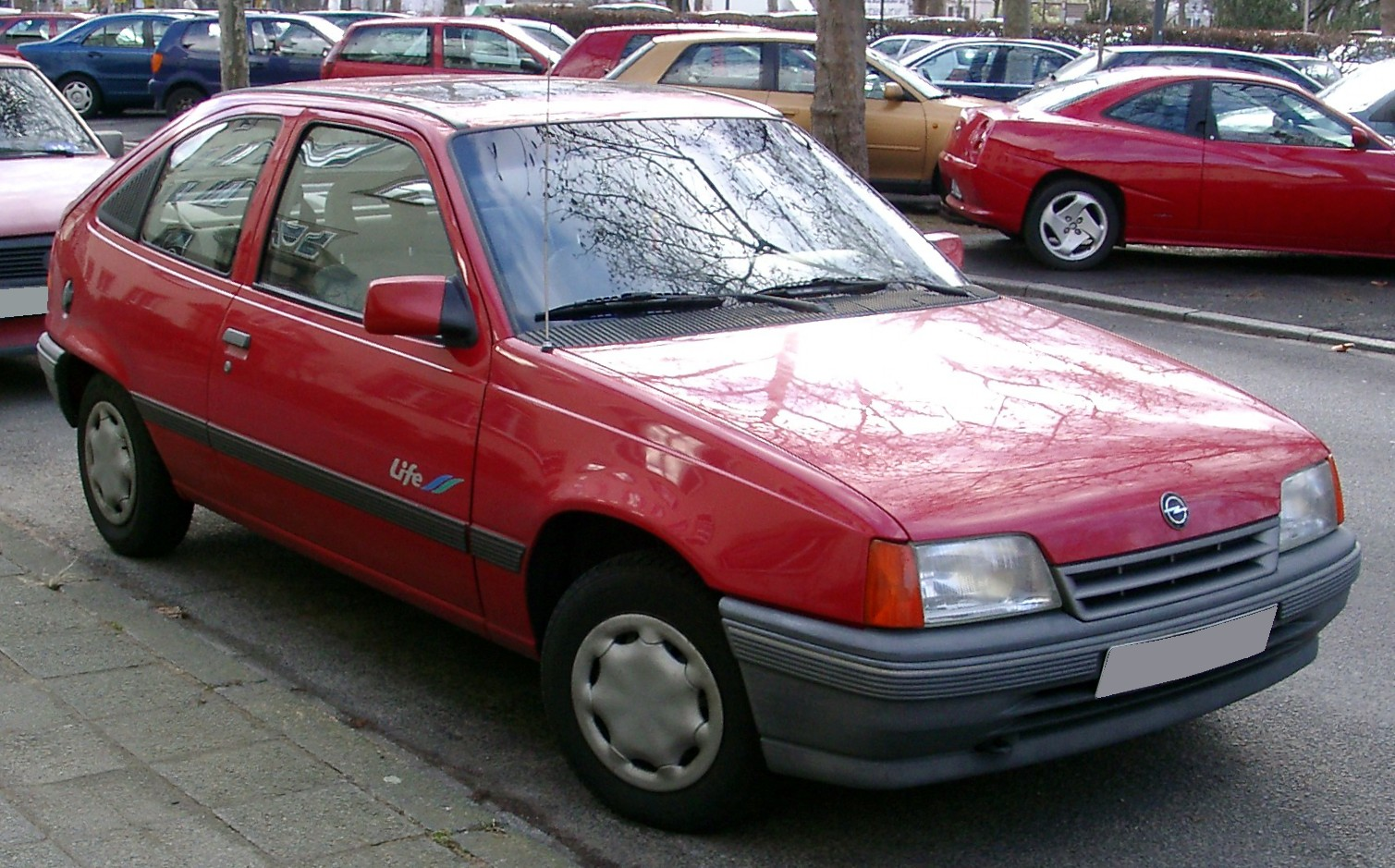
Opel Kadett 3-door (1989–1995)

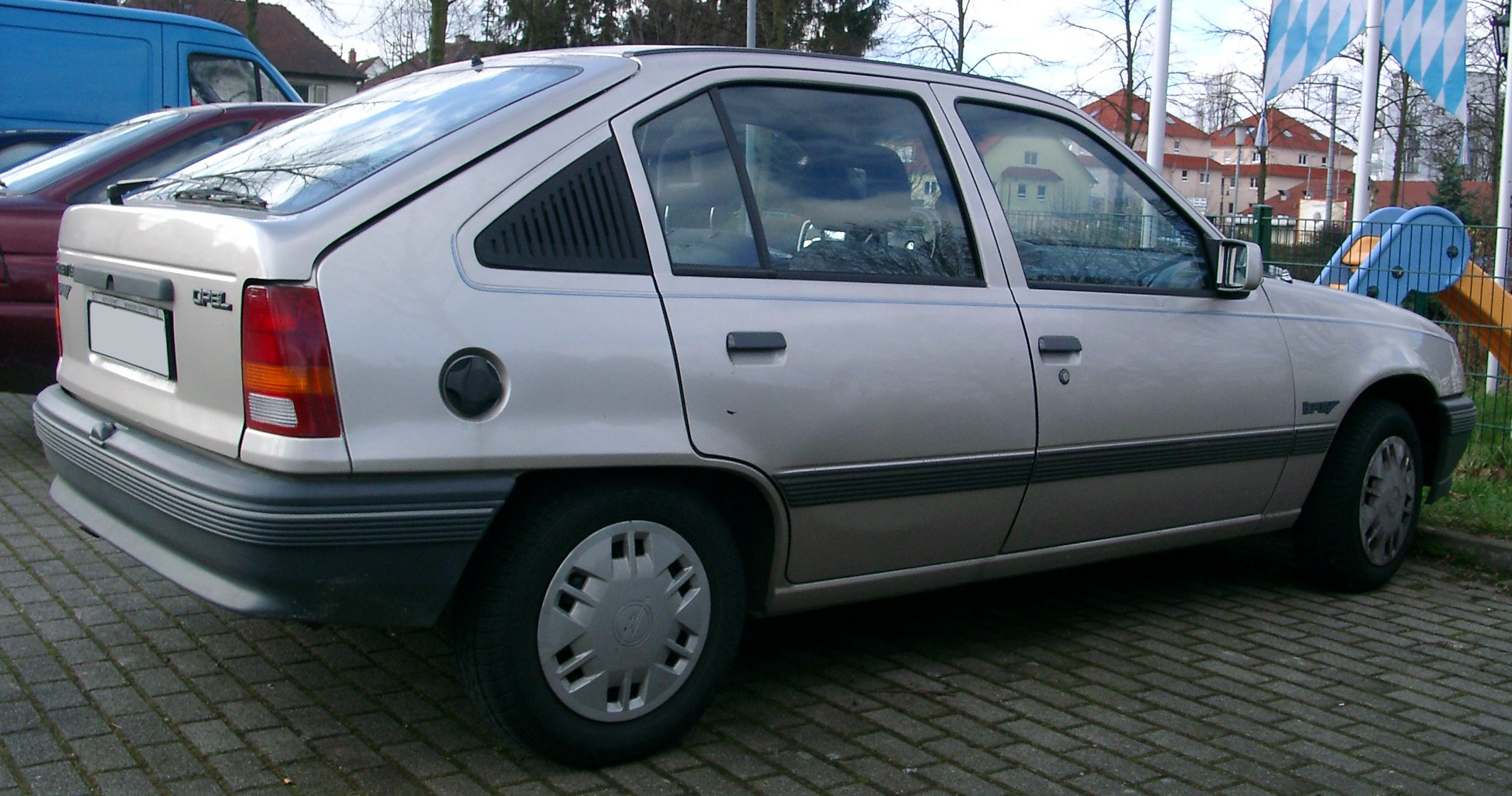
Opel Kadett 5-door (1989–1995)

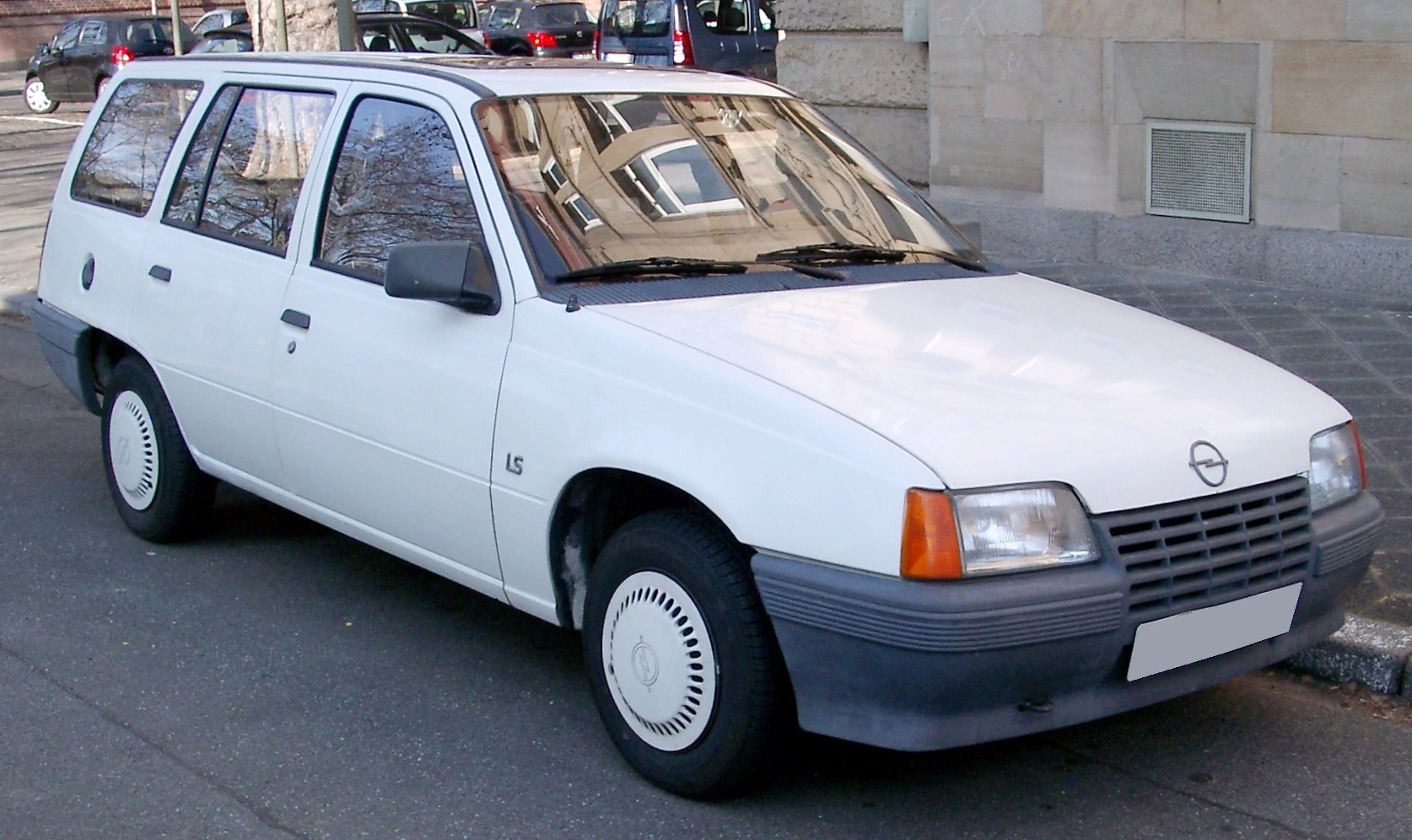
Opel Kadett Caravan (1984–1989)

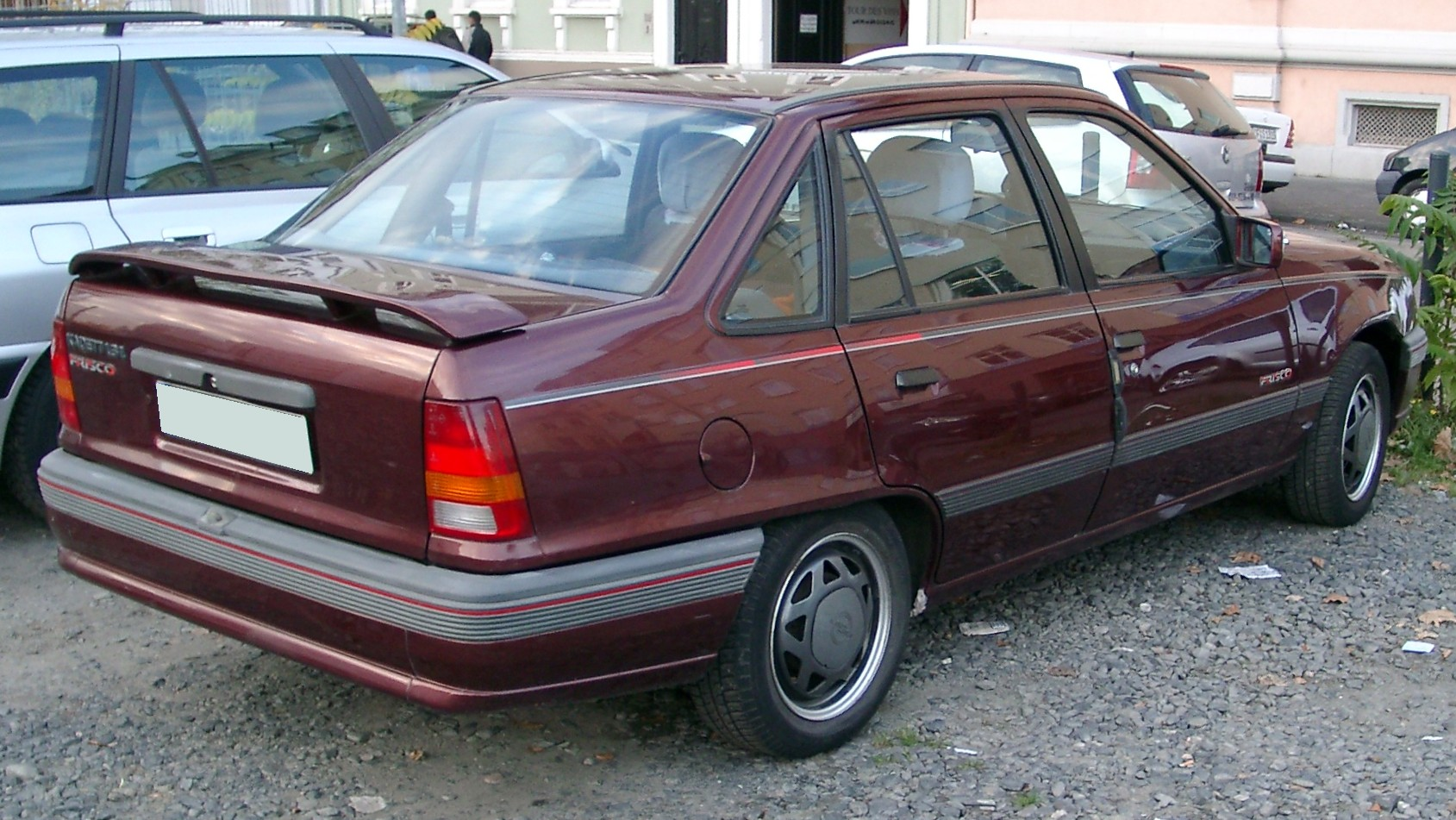
Opel Kadett saloon (rear; 1989–1995)

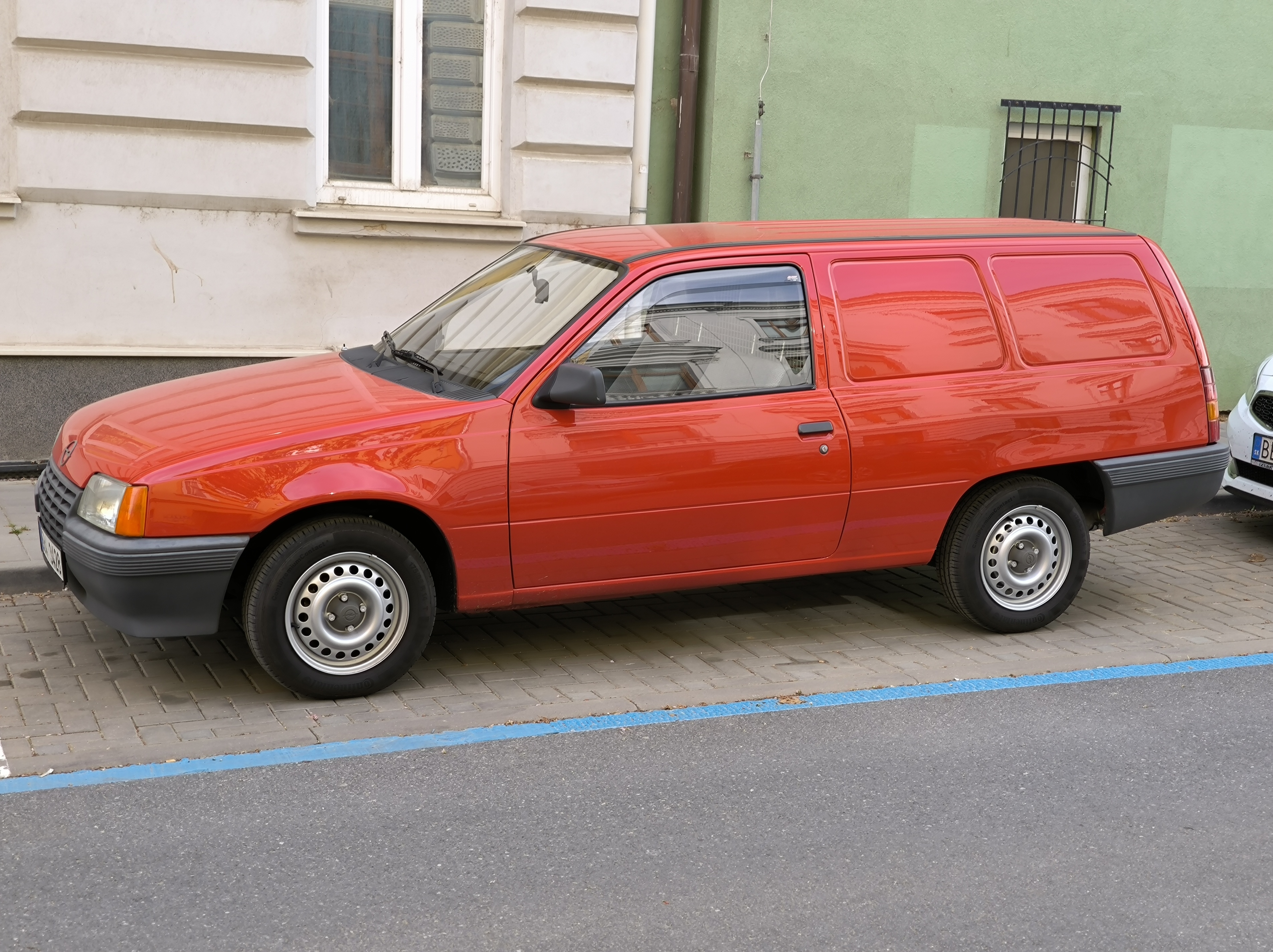
Opel Kadett Van (1984–1988)

== Name change to Astra ==
In 1991, GM Europe decided to standardise model names across its two brands, and Opel adopted Vauxhall's name for the Kadett, Astra, for the replacement car for Europe which debuted that year. Only South Africa kept the Kadett name until the 1999 (Astra/Kadett F), whereafter all models took the Astra name.

However, under Opel's internal naming convention, successive generations of the Astra platform are treated as a logical continuation of the Kadett lineage, hence the original 1991 Astra was designated Astra F in relation to the previous Kadett E. This convention has continued through the current Astra L.

== See also ==
- GM Stir-Lec I, 1969 concept hybrid electric car based on Opel Kadett body

== General and cited references ==
- Oswald, Werner (2001). Deutsche Autos 1920–1945 [German cars, 1920–1945] (in German). Vol. 2. Motorbuch Verlag. ISBN 3-613-02170-6.
- Oswald, Werner (2003). Deutsche Autos 1945–1990 [German cars, 1945–1990] (in German). Vol. 3. Motorbuch Verlag. ISBN 3-613-02116-1.
- Schulz, Peter (2010). Opel Kadett – alle Modellreihen. Königswinter: Heel. ISBN 978-3-86852-295-2.
