= 2012 in Germany =

- Decades: 1990s; 2000s; 2010s; 2020s; 2030s
- See also: Other events of 2012; History of Germany • Timeline • Years

The following is a list of events from the year 2012 in Germany.

== Incumbents ==
=== Federal level ===
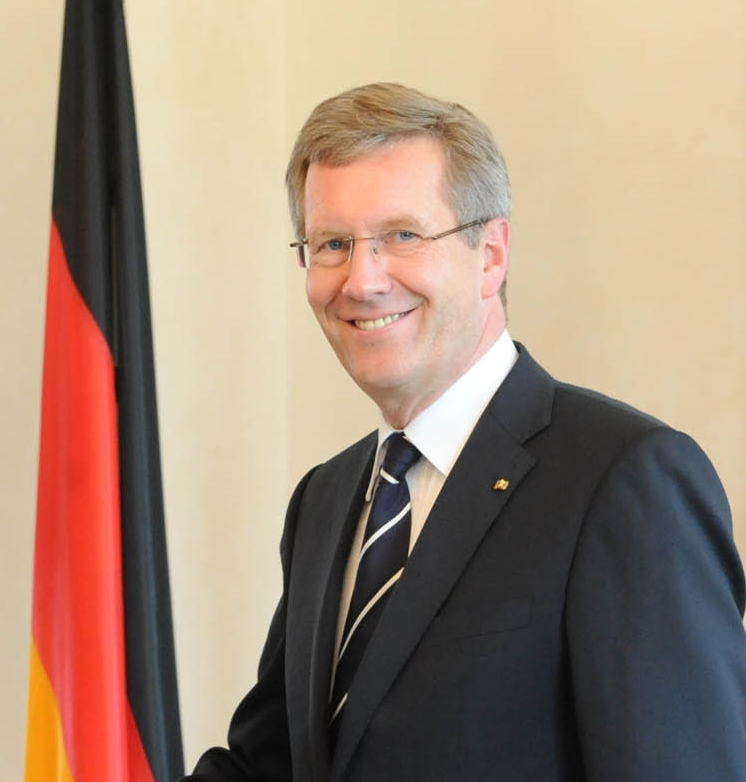
Christian Wulff

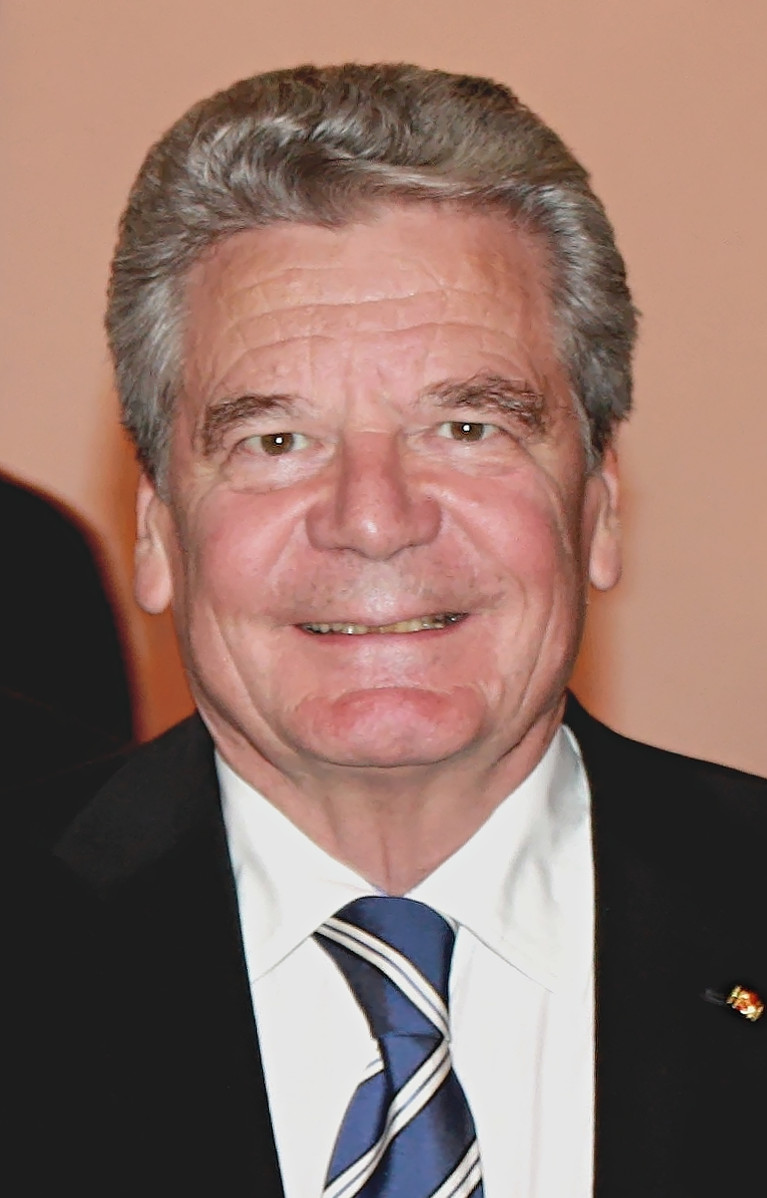
Joachim Gauck

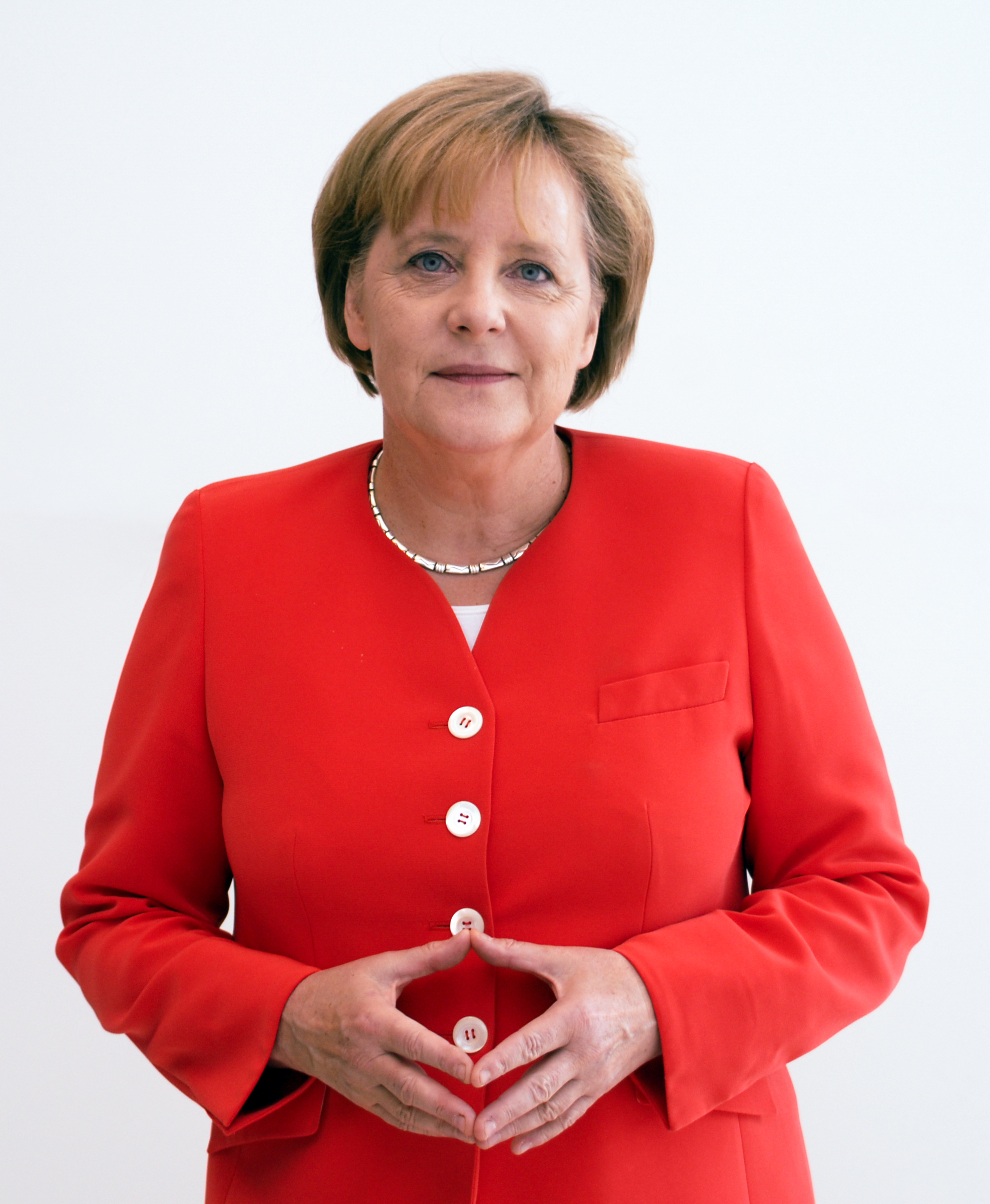
Angela Merkel

- President:
  - Christian Wulff (until 17 February 2012)
  - Horst Seehofer (Acting; 17 February – 18 March 2012)
  - Joachim Gauck (from 18 March 2012)
- Chancellor: Angela Merkel

=== State level ===
- Minister-President of Baden-Wuerttemberg – Winfried Kretschmann
- Minister-President of Bavaria – Horst Seehofer
- Mayor of Berlin – Klaus Wowereit
- Minister-President of Brandenburg – Matthias Platzeck
- Mayor of Bremen – Jens Boehrnsen
- Mayor of Hamburg – Olaf Scholz
- Minister-President of Hesse – Volker Bouffier
- Minister-President of Mecklenburg-Vorpommern – Erwin Sellering
- Minister-President of Niedersachsen – David McAllister
- Minister-President of North Rhine-Westphalia – Hannelore Kraft
- Minister-President of Rhineland-Palatinate – Kurt Beck
- Minister-President of Saarland – Annegret Kramp-Karrenbauer
- Minister-President of Saxony – Stanislaw Tillich
- Minister-President of Saxony-Anhalt – Reiner Haseloff
- Minister-President of Schleswig-Holstein – Peter Harry Carstensen to 12 June Torsten Albig
- Minister-President of Thuringia – Christine Lieberknecht

== Events ==
=== January – June ===
- 6 January – In state Saarland coalition of Annegret Kramp-Karrenbauer breaks up.
- 20 January – Bavarian Film Awards in Munich
- 23 January – The drugstore Schlecker files for bankruptcy.
- 9–19 February – 62nd Berlin International Film Festival in Berlin
- 16 February – Roman Lob is selected to represent Germany in the Eurovision Song Contest.
- 17 February – German President Christian Wulff resigns following a major loan scandal.
- 19 February – Joachim Gauck is chosen as the main candidate to succeed Christian Wulff.
- 27 February – The party Die Linke selects Beate Klarsfeld as its candidate to succeed Christian Wulff.
- 29 February – Schlecker announces the closure of half its stores across Germany.
- 6–10 March – CeBIT in Hanover
- 7–11 March – ITB Berlin in Berlin
- 15–18 March – Leipzig Book Fair in Leipzig
- 18 March – German presidential election, 2012 – Joachim Gauck is elected President of Germany, taking the oath of office on 23 March
- 25 March – 1 April – 2012 World Team Table Tennis Championships in Dortmund
- 25 March – Elections in state Saarland
- 23–27 April – Hannover Messe in Hanover
- 27 April – Deutscher Filmpreis in Berlin
- 6 May – Elections in Schleswig-Holstein
- 13 May – Elections in North Rhine-Westphalia – Hannelore Kraft is elected to continue as Minister-President, heading an SPD-Green coalition.
- 22 May – Peter Altmaier replaces Norbert Rottgen as Environment Minister.
- 26 May – Roman Lob represents Germany in the Eurovision Song Contest, finishing 8th.
- June – The Germany national football team takes part in UEFA Euro 2012.
- 9 June – 16 September: dOCUMENTA (13)
- 12 June – Torsten Albig is elected as Minister-President of Schleswig-Holstein, after the SPD, Greens and South Schleswig Voter Federation agree to form a coalition in the state.
- 18–24 June – Kiel Week in Kiel
- 28 June – UEFA Euro 2012: The Germany national football team is knocked out at the semi-final stage, by the Italy national football team, through two goals from Mario Balotelli.
- Date unknown: As the largest German-Sino transaction ever, at the end of January 2012 German company Putzmeister was sold to the company Chinese Sany Heavy Industries.

=== July – December ===
- 3 July – Heinz Fromm resigns as Head of the Federal Office for the Protection of the Constitution, following controversies over the organisation's handling of the far-right.
- early July – Success for German players in the Wimbledon tennis Singles: In the Men's section, Florian Mayer and Philipp Kohlschreiber reach the quarter-finals; in the Women's section, Sabine Lisicki reaches the quarter-finals, and Angelique Kerber reaches the semi-finals.
- 13 July – FIFA President Sepp Blatter alleges that there were irregularities when Germany won the right to host the 2006 FIFA World Cup.
- 31 July – Germany wins its first Gold Medals of the 2012 Summer Olympics in London, in the Equestrian sport, taking team gold, and with Michael Jung taking individual gold.
- 9–12 August – Hanse Sail in Rostock
- 31 August – 5 September – Internationale Funkausstellung Berlin in Berlin
- 11–16 September – ILA Berlin Air Show in Berlin
- 12 September – The German Constitutional Court in Karlsruhe ruled, that the new European bailout fund was inline with the German constitution.
- 15–19 September – Gamescom in Cologne
- 18–23 September – photokina in Cologne
- 20–27 September – Frankfurt Motor Show in Frankfurt
- 21 September – JadeWeserPort opened.
- 22 September – 7 October – Oktoberfest in Munich
- 28 September – The SPD selects Peer Steinbruck as its candidate to face Angela Merkel in the German federal election, 2013.
- 4 October – Michael Schumacher announces his retirement from Formula One.
- 5 October – Footballer Michael Ballack announces an end to his playing career.
- 10–14 October – Frankfurt Book Fair, with special guest New Zealand.
- 12 November – 2012 MTV Europe Music Awards in Frankfurt
- 25 November – In Formula One, German driver Sebastian Vettel wins the Drivers' Championship for the third consecutive year.
- 26 November – A fire at a workshop for disabled people in Southwestern Germany kills 14 people.
- 6 December – German officials tried to outlaw the Nationalist National Democratic Party of Germany, with the interior ministers of all 16 states recommending a ban. The Federal Constitutional Court is yet to vote on the recommendation.
- 10 December – An explosive device is found, and made safe, at the main railway station in Bonn.
- 25 December – Joachim Gauck makes his first Christmas address as President.
- Date unknown: German company Volkswagen Group acquired Italian company Ducati and German companies MAN and Porsche.

== Deaths ==
=== January ===
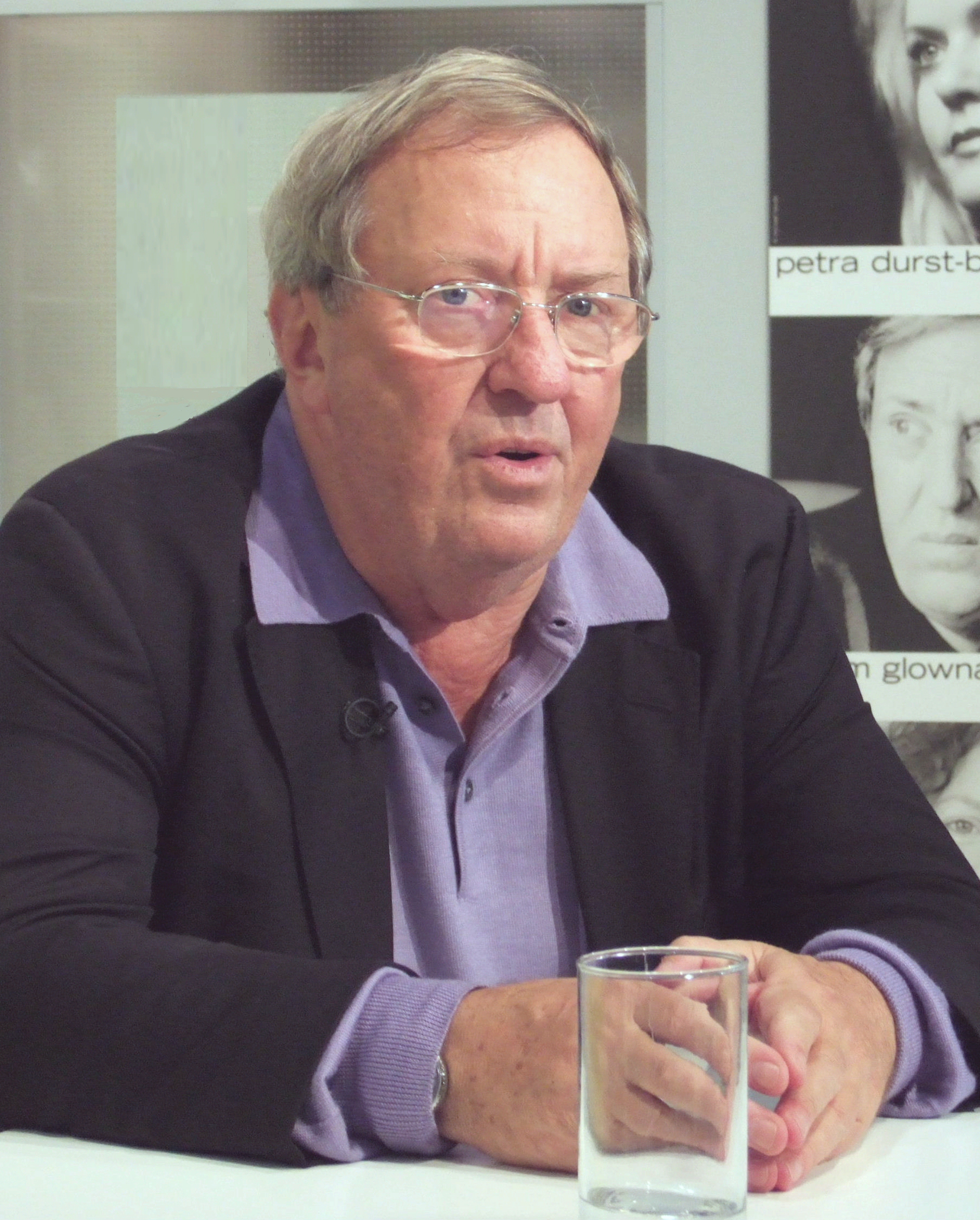
Vadim Glowna 1941–2012

- 2 January – Helmut Müller-Brühl, 78, conductor (b. 1933)
- 3 January – Willi Entenmann, 68, footballer and coach (b. 1943)
- 4 January – Xaver Unsinn, 82, ice hockey player (b. 1929)
- 8 January – Bernhard Schrader, chemist and academic (b. 1931)
- 10 January – Kyra T. Inachin, 43, historian (b. 1968)
- 13 January – Guido Dessauer, 96, paper engineer and art collector (b. 1915)
- 17 January – Julius Meimberg, 95, Luftwaffe flying ace (b. 1917)
- 18 January – Georg Lassen, 96, naval officer (b. 1915)
- 24 January – Vadim Glowna, 70, actor and film director (b. 1941)
- 25 January – Veronica Carstens, 88, former First Lady (b. 1923)

=== February ===
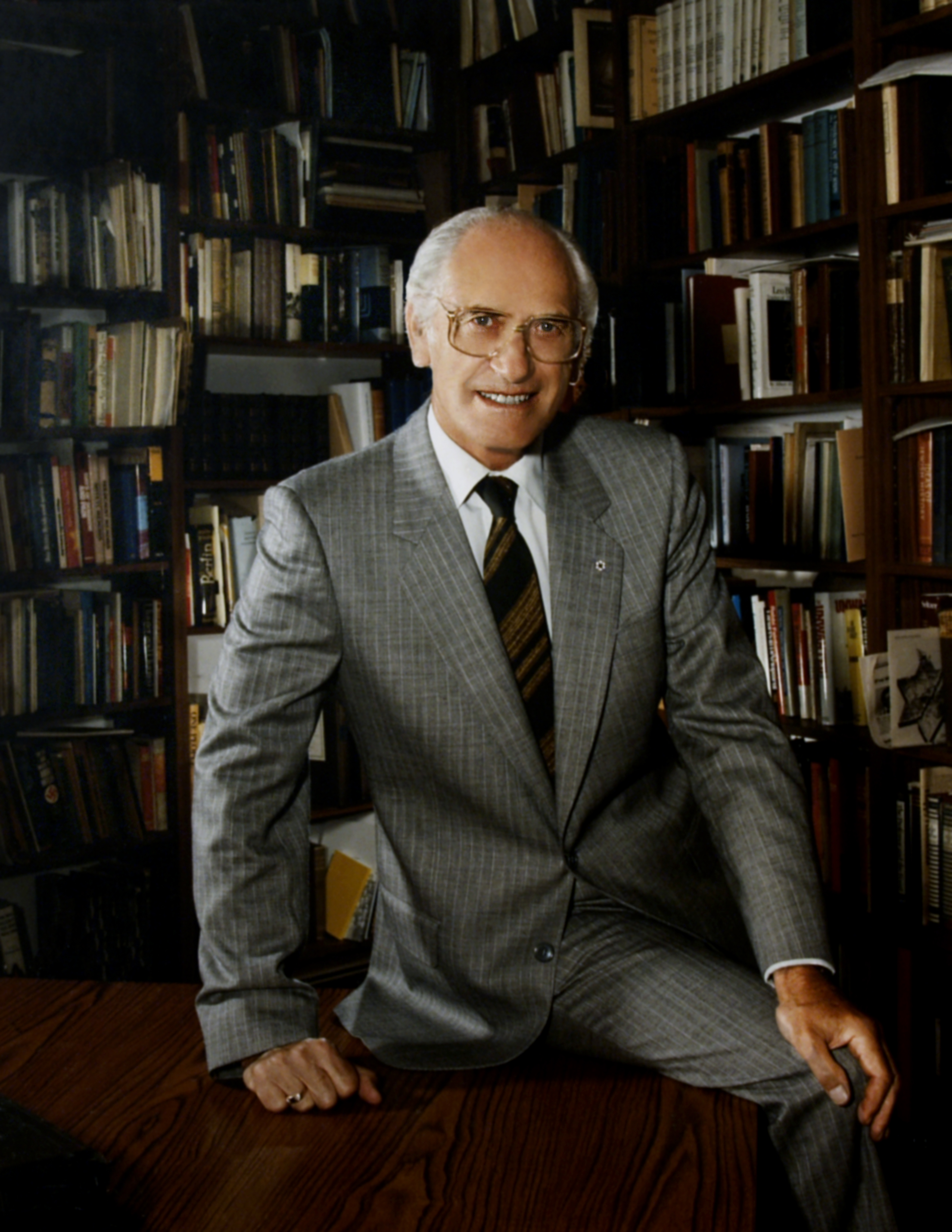
Gunther Plaut 1912–2012

- 1 February – Lutz Philipp, 71, Olympic athlete (b. 1940)
- 2 February – Paul Consbruch, 81, Roman Catholic prelate (b. 1930)
- 8 February – Gunther Plaut, 99, German-born Canadian rabbi and author (b. 1912)
- 20 February – Imanuel Geiss, 81, historian (b. 1931)
- 25 February – Louisiana Red, 79, American blues musician (b. 1932)
- 27 February – Werner Guballa, 67, Roman Catholic bishop (b. 1944)

=== March ===
- 11 March – Hans G. Helms, 79, experimental writer (b. 1932)
- 13 March – Princess Anna of Saxony, 82, noblewoman (b. 1929)
- 19 March – Karl-Heinz Spickenagel, 80, footballer (b. 1932)
- 21 March – Albrecht Dietz, 86, entrepreneur and scientist (b. 1926)

=== April ===
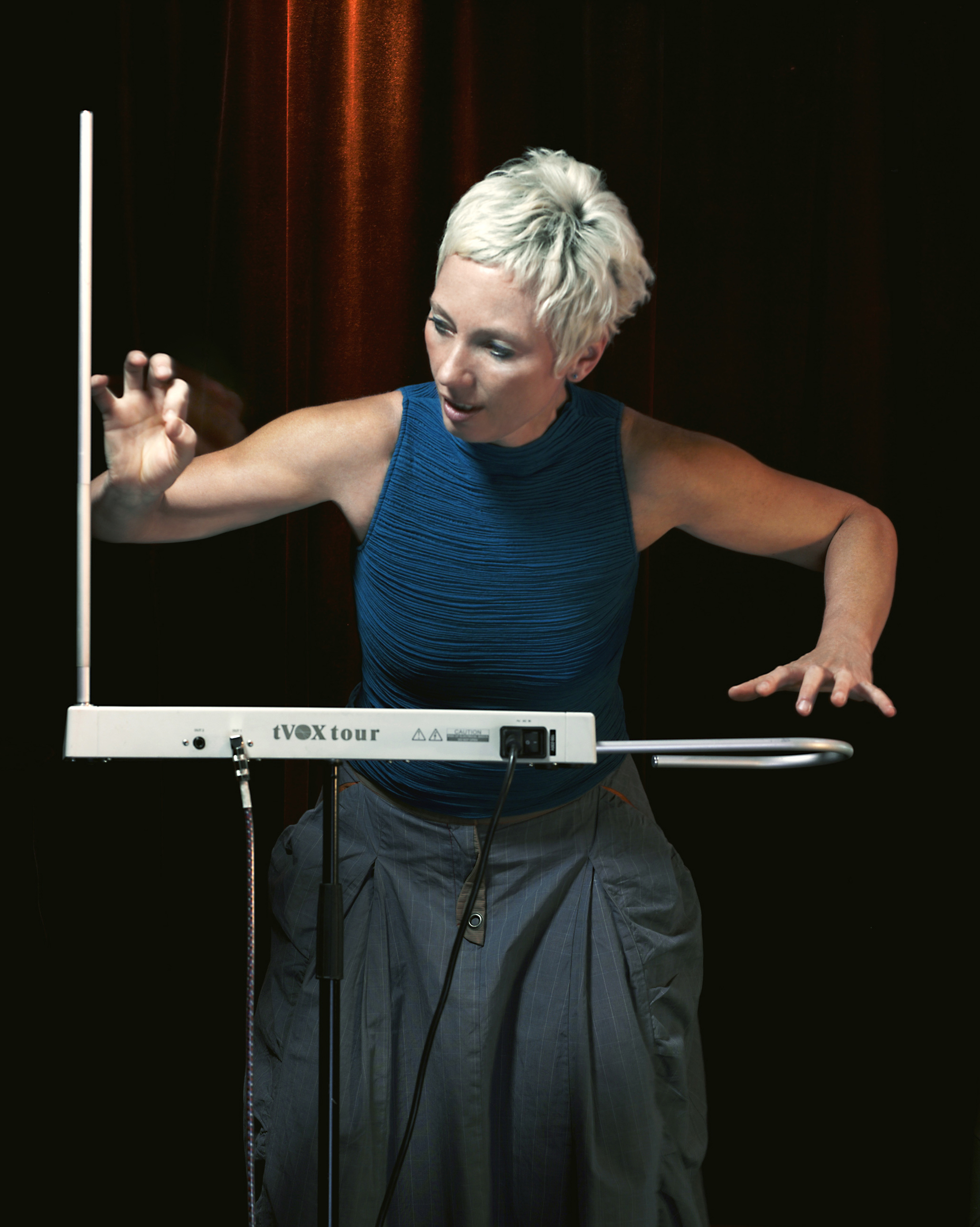
Barbara Buchholz 1959–2012

- 5 April – Ferdinand Alexander Porsche, 76, entrepreneur and auto designer (b. 1935)
- 6 April – Heinz Kunert, German engineer (b. 1927)
- 9 April – Ivan Nagel, 80, theatre director (b. 1931)
- 10 April – Barbara Buchholz, 52, musician and composer (b. 1959)
- 12 April – Manfred Orzessek, 78, footballer (b. 1933)
- 18 April – Fritz Theilen, 84, resistance activist (b. 1927)
- 20 April – Peter Carsten, 83, actor (b. 1928)
- 21 April – Heinz Jentzsch, 92, racehorse trainer (b. 1920)

=== May ===
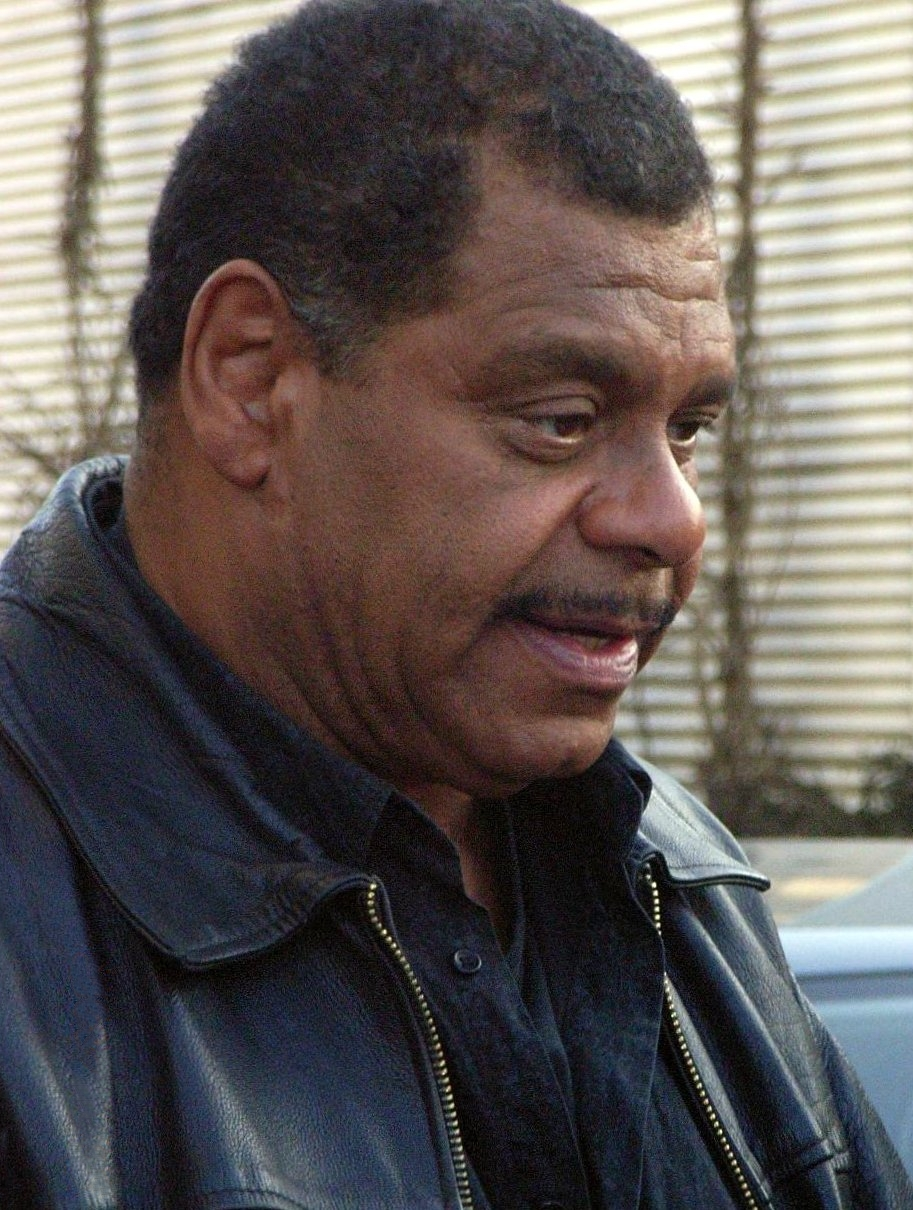
Günther Kaufmann

- 3 May – Felix Werder, 90, German-born Australian composer (b. 1922)
- 10 May
  - Horst Faas, 79, photojournalist (b. 1933)
  - Gunther Kaufmann, 64, actor (b. 1947)
- 12 May
  - Ernst Josef Fittkau, 75, entomologist (b. 1927)
  - Fritz Ursell, 89, German-born British mathematician (b. 1923)
- 15 May
  - Peter Koslowski, 59, philosopher and academic (b. 1952)
  - Arno Lustiger, 88, Polish-born writer and historian of Judaism (b. 1922)
- 16 May – Hans Geister, 83, athlete (b. 1928)
- 18 May
  - Dietrich Fischer-Dieskau, 86, baritone and conductor (b. 1925)
  - Hans-Dieter Lange, 85, television journalist (b. 1926)
- 19 May – Gerhard Hetz 69, swimmer (b. 1942)
- 24 May – Klaas Carel Faber, 90, Dutch-born war criminal, died in Ingolstadt (b. 1922)
- 27 May – Friedrich Hirzebruch, 84, mathematician (b. 1927)
- 30 May – Gerhard Pohl, 74, politician (b. 1937)

=== June ===
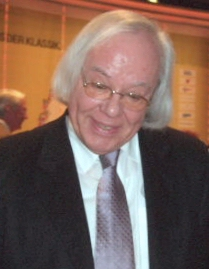
Karl-Heinz Kammerling 1930–2012

- 9 June – Audrey Arno, 70, pop singer (b. 1942)
- 12 June – Margarete Mitscherlich-Nielsen, 94, psychoanalyst (b. 1917)
- 14 June – Karl-Heinz Kammerling, 82, academic teacher of pianists (b. 1930)
- 18 June – Lina Haag, 105, anti-fascist activist during World War II. (b. 1907)
- 20 June – Heinrich IV, Prince Reuss of Kostritz, 92, nobleman (b. 1919)
- 24 June
  - Gad Beck, 88, Resistance activist and Holocaust survivor (b. 1923)
  - Franz Crass, 84, bass singer (b. 1928)
  - Rudolf Schmid, 97, Swiss-born German Roman Catholic bishop (b. 1914)
- 25 June – Doris Schade, 88, television actress (b. 1924)
- 27 June – Ralph Warren Victor Elliott, 90, German-born Australian professor of English and runologist (b. 1921)

=== July ===
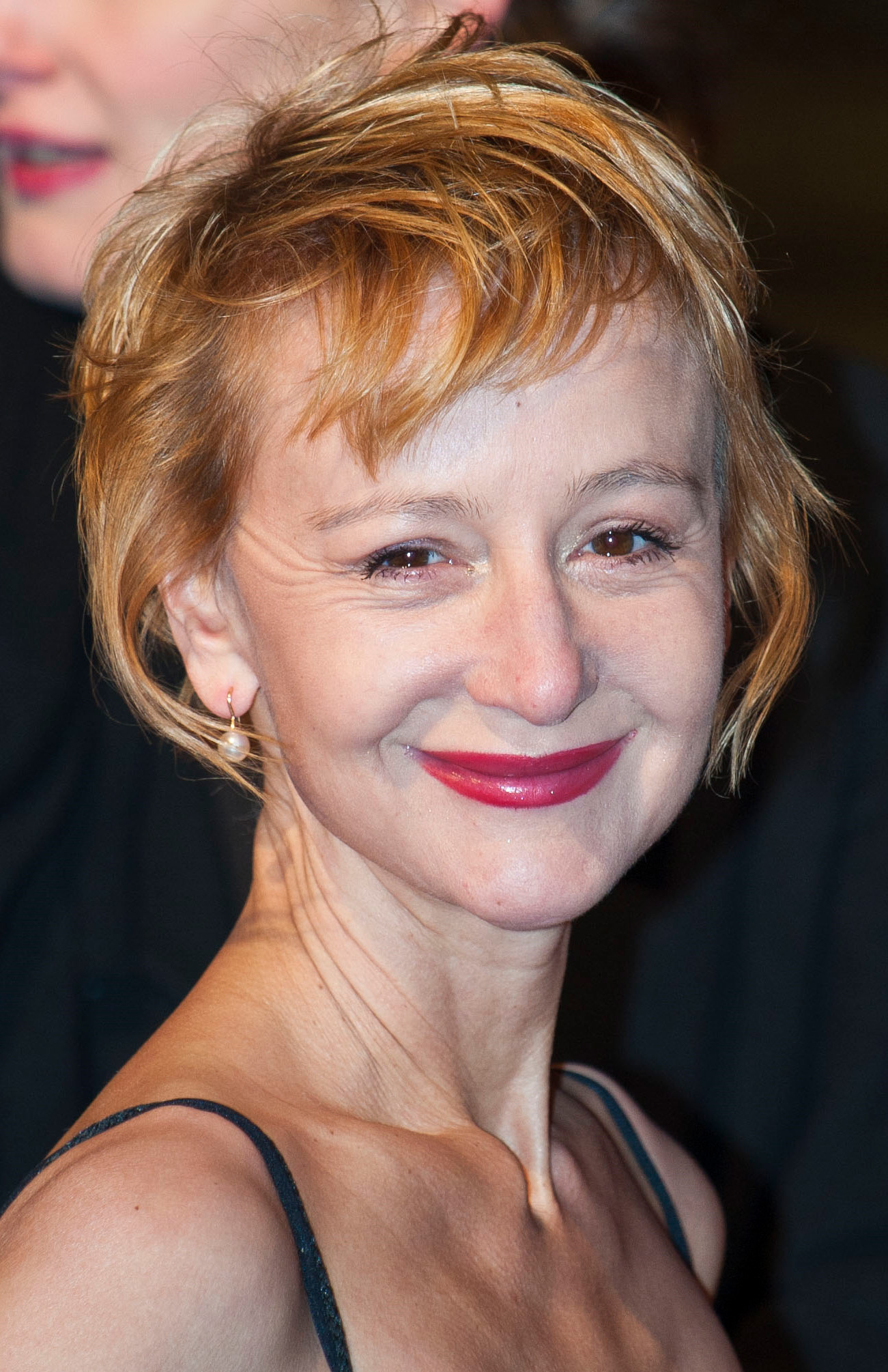
Susanne Lothar 1960–2012

- 10 July – Fritz Langanke, 92, Waffen SS Lieutenant (b. 1919)
- 18 July – Günther Maleuda, 81, politician, President of the People's Chamber (1989–1990) (b. 1931)
- 19 July – Hans Nowak, 74, footballer (b. 1937)
- 21 July – Susanne Lothar, 51, actress (b. 1960)
- 23 July – Maria Emanuel, Margrave of Meissen, 86, head of the Royal House of Saxony (b. 1926)
- 27 July – Carl-Ludwig Wagner, 82, politician, former Minister-President of Rhineland-Palatinate (b. 1930)
- 29 July – Heinz Staab, 86, chemist (b. 1926)
- 31 July – Rudolf Kreitlein, 92, football referee (b. 1919)

=== August ===
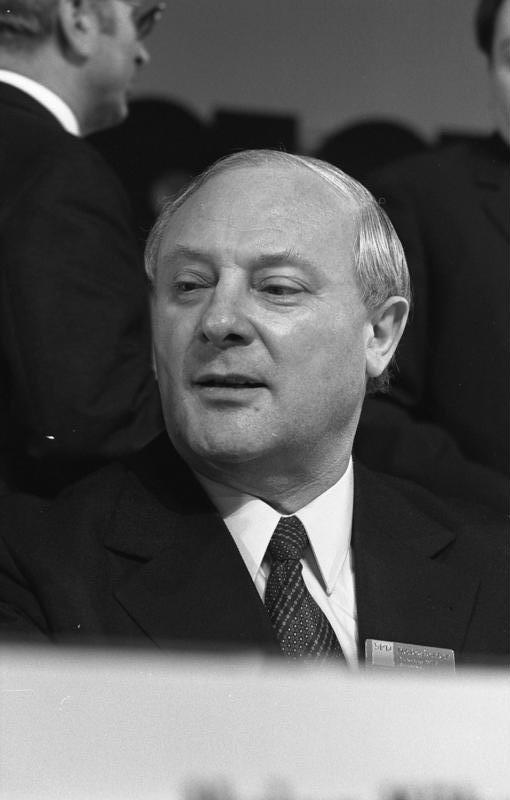
Georg Leber 1920-2012

- 2 August – Bernd Meier, 40, footballer (b. 1972)
- 8 August – Kurt Maetzig, 101, film director (b. 1911)
- 19 August – Hellmut Geissner, 86, scholar (b. 1926)
- 21 August – Georg Leber, 91, politician (b. 1920)
- 24 August – Georg Feuerstein, 65, German-born Canadian scholar of Hinduism (b. 1947)
- 26 August – Krzysztof Wilmanski, 72, Polish-born German scientist (b. 1940)
- 28 August – Alfred Schmidt, 81, philosopher (b. 1931)
- 30 August – Paul Friedrichs, 72, motocross racer (b. 1940)
- 31 August – Norbert Walter, 67, economist (b. 1944)

=== September ===
- 8 September
  - Adolf Bechtold, 86, footballer (b. 1926)
  - Peter Hussing, 64, boxer (b. 1948)
- 16 September – Friedrich Zimmermann, 87, politician (b. 1925)
- 21 September – Sven Hassel, 95, Danish-born German soldier and author (b. 1917)

=== October ===
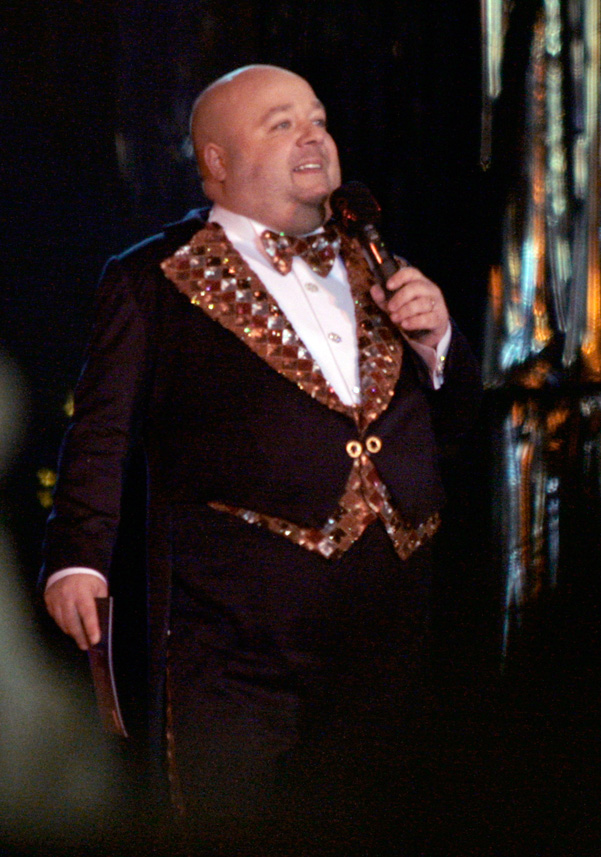
Dirk Bach 1961-2012

- 1 October – Dirk Bach, 51, comedian, actor and television presenter (b. 1961)
- 4 October – Erhard Wunderlich, 55, handball player (b. 1956)
- 6 October – Albert, Margrave of Meissen, 77, nobleman (b. 1934)
- 11 October – Helmut Haller, 73, footballer (b. 1939)
- 12 October – Harry Valérien, 88, sports journalist and presenter (b. 1923)
- 17 October – Henry Friedlander, 82, German-born American Jewish historian (b. 1930)
- 27 October – Hans Werner Henze, 86, composer (b. 1926)
- 31 October – Alfons Demming, 84, Roman Catholic prelate (b. 1928)

=== November ===
- 8 November – Pete Namlook, 51, composer and producer (b. 1960)
- 10 November – Wilhelm Hennis, 89, political scientist (b. 1923)
- 18 November – Helmut Sonnenfeldt, 96, German-born American foreign policy official (b. 1926)
- 29 November – Klaus Schutz, 86, former Mayor of Berlin (b. 1926)

=== December ===
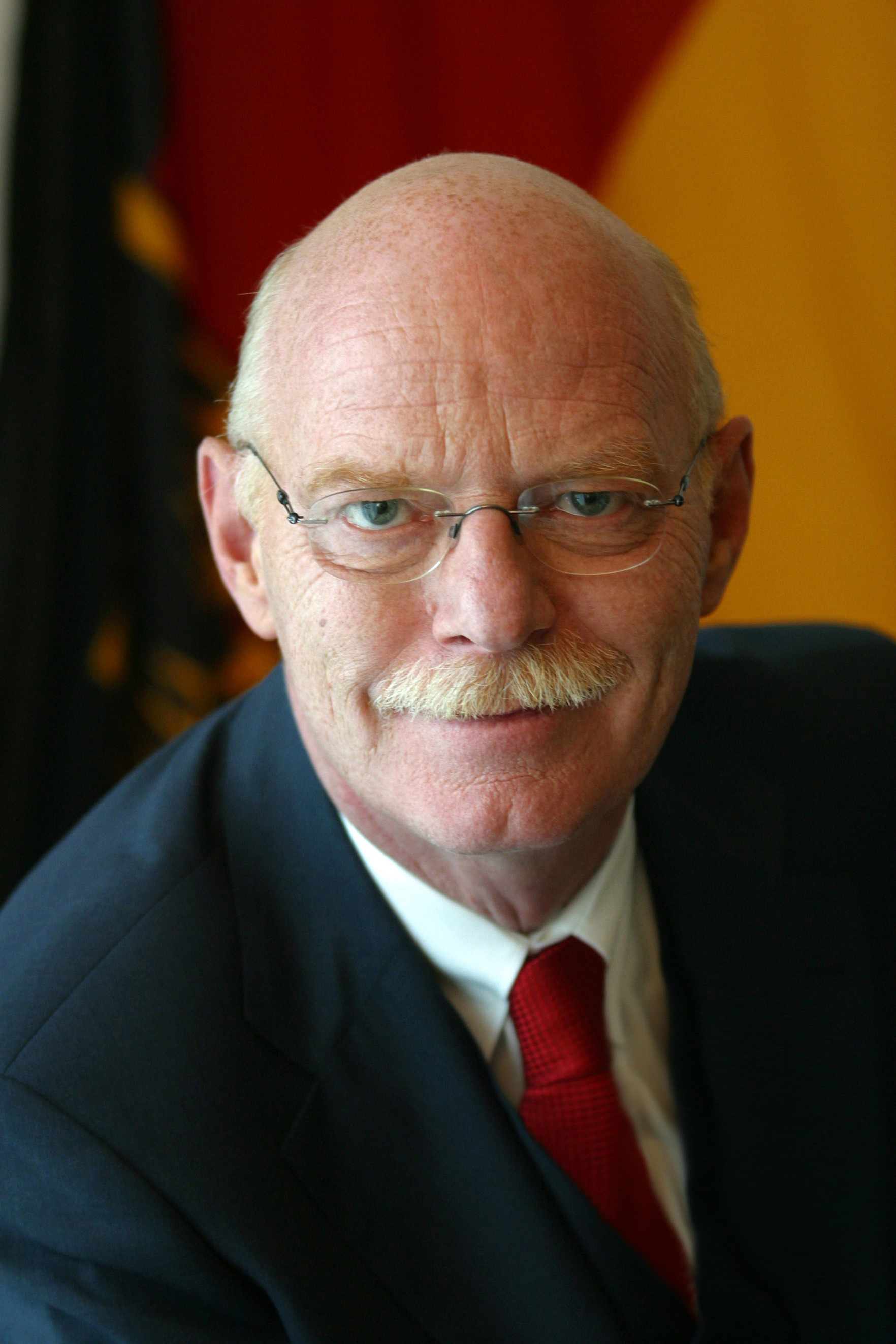
Peter Struck 1943-2012

- 4 December – Peter Kiesewetter, 67, composer (b. 1945)
- 7 December – Berthold Albrecht, 58, businessman (b. 1954)
- 11 December – Albert O. Hirschman, 97, German-born American economist (b. 1915)
- 14 December – Klaus Koste, 69, gymnast (b. 1943)
- 16 December – Axel Anderson, 83, German-born Puerto Rican actor (b. 1929)
- 19 December – Peter Struck, 69, politician (b. 1943)
- 25 December – Rudolf Muller, 81, Roman Catholic prelate (b. 1931)
- 27 December – Jesco von Puttkamer, 79, German-born American aerospace engineer (b. 1933)
- 28 December – Emmanuel Scheffer, 88, German-born Israeli football coach (b. 1924)

== See also ==
- 2012 in German television
