= Hellmut =

Hellmut is a given name. Notable people with the name include:

- Hellmut Andics (1922–1998), Austrian journalist, publicist, and writer
- Hellmut Bunge (1920–2006), Hauptmann in the Wehrmacht during World War II, recipient of the Knight's Cross of the Iron Cross
- Hellmut von der Chevallerie (1896–1965), General of the Infantry in the German Wehrmacht during the World War II
- Sigismund Hellmut von Dawans (1899–1944), general in the Wehrmacht during World War II, recipient of the German Cross in Gold
- Hellmut Diwald (1924–1993), German historian and Professor of Medieval and Modern History at the University of Erlangen-Nuremberg
- Hellmut Federhofer (1911–2014), Austrian musicologist
- Hellmut Flashar (1929–2022), German philologist and translator
- Hellmut Fritzsche (1927–2018), American physicist
- Hellmut Geissner (1926–2012), German scholar of speech and rhetoric
- Hellmut von Gerlach (1866–1935), German journalist and politician
- Hellmut G. Haasis (born 1942), German historian, author, and broadcaster
- Hellmut Hattler (born 1952), German jazz and bass player
- Hellmut Kerutt (1916–2000), Major in the Fallschirmjäger during World War II and an Oberst in the Bundeswehr
- Hans Hellmut Kirst (1914–1989), German novelist and the author of 46 books
- Hellmut Kneser (1898–1973), Baltic German mathematician who made notable contributions to group theory and topology
- Hellmut Krug (born 1956), retired German football referee
- Hellmut Lange (1923–2011), actor and journalist who became famous as action hero on TV
- Hellmut Lantschner (1909–1993), Austrian and German alpine skier and world champion
- Hellmut von Leipzig (born 1921), Leutnant der Reserve of the Brandenburgers in the Wehrmacht during World War II
- Hellmut Maneval (1898–1967), German international footballer
- Hellmut May (1921–2011), figure skater who represented Austria at the Winter Olympics in 1936 and 1948
- Hellmut Röhnisch (1914–1996), universal language activist, businessman and athlete
- Hellmut Rohweder (1914–2008), German chief engineer on a U-boat in World War II and recipient of the Knight's Cross of the Iron Cross
- Hellmut Schmid (1914–1998), Professor of geodesy and photogrammetry on the ETH Zürich (Switzerland)
- Hellmut Seibt (1929–1992), Austrian figure skater
- Hellmut Ludwig Späth (1885–1945), the sixth and last manager of the Späth nursery on the death of his father in 1913
- Hellmut W. Stolle (1905–1977), German-born American politician
- Hellmut Wilhelm (1905–1990), German sinologist known for his broad knowledge of both Chinese literature and Chinese history
- Hellmut Wolff (1906–1986), German academic, mystic, Germanic revivalist, and most notably a Pendulum dowser

== See also ==
- Hellmut Seibt Memorial "Hellmut Seibt Memorial 2014 Interclub
- Helmut
- Hellmuth
- Helmuth
