= Helmut =

Helmut is a German masculine given name. Variants include Hellmut, Helmuth, and Hellmuth. From old German, the first element deriving from either heil ("healthy") or hiltja ("battle"), and the second from muot ("spirit, mind, mood").

Helmut may refer to:

== People ==
=== A–L ===
- Hellmut Diwald (1924–1993), German historian
- Hellmut Hattler (born 1952), German musician
- Hellmut von Gerlach (1866–1935), German journalist
- Helmut Angula (born 1945), Namibian politician
- Helmut Ashley (1919–2021), Austrian director and cinematographer
- Helmut Bakaitis (born 1944), Australian director and actor
- Helmut Berger (1944–2023), Austrian actor
- Helmut Cacau (born 1981), German-Brazilian football player, nicknamed Helmut
- Helmut Dantine (1917–1982), Austrian actor
- Helmut Deutsch (born 1945), Austrian classical pianist
- Helmut Ditsch (born 1962), Argentine painter
- Helmut Donner (born 1941), Austrian high jumper
- Helmut Duckadam (1959–2024), Romanian footballer
- Helmut Fischer (1926–1997), German actor
- Helmut Goebbels (1935–1945), only son of Joseph Goebbels
- Helmut Graeb, German electrical engineer
- Helmut Griem (1932–2004), German actor
- Helmut Gröttrup (1916–1981), German rocket scientist
- Helmut Haller (1939–2012), German football player
- Helmut Hasse (1898–1979), German mathematician
- Helmut Haussmann (born 1943), German academic and politician
- Helmut Hirsch (1916–1937) German student executed for opposing the Nazi government
- Helmut Holzapfel (tenor) (born 1941), South African tenor
- Helmut Holzapfel (urban planner) (born 1950), German academic
- Helmut Jahn (1940–2021), German-born American architect
- Helmut Kiderlen (1905–1995), German geologist
- Helmut Kohl (1930–2017), German statesman
- Helmut Koinigg (1948–1974), Austrian racing driver
- Helmut Köllen (1950–1977), German musician
- Helmut Krieger (born 1958), Polish shot putter
- Helmut Lachenmann (born 1935), German composer
- Helmut Landsberg (1906–1985), German scientist
- Helmut Lang (artist) (born 1956), German fashion designer
- Helmut Lemke (1907–1990), German politician
- Helmut Lotti (born 1969), Belgian singer

=== M–Z ===
- Helmut Marko (born 1943), Austrian racing driver
- Helmut Newton (1920–2004), German-born Australian photographer
- Helmut Norpoth (born 1943), German-born political scientist
- Helmut Oberlander (1924–2021), Ukrainian former Canadian who was a member of the Einsatzgruppen death squads of Nazi Germany in the occupied Soviet Union during World War II
- Helmut Rahn (1929–2003), German football player
- Helmut Rohde (1925–2016), German politician
- Helmut Rothemund (1929–2004), German politician
- Helmut Schelsky (1912–1984), German sociologist
- Helmut Schmidt (1918–2015), German politician, chancellor
- Helmut Schoeck (1922–1993), Austrian sociologist
- Helmut Schön (1915–1996), German football player and manager
- Helmut Sick (1910–1991), Brazilian ornithologist
- Helmut Sonnenfeldt (1926–2012), American foreign policy expert
- Helmut Vetter (1910–1949), German Nazi SS officer at Auschwitz concentration camp executed for war crimes
- Helmut Walcha (1907–1991), German organist
- Helmut Zahn (1916–2004), German chemist
- Helmut Zilk (1927–2008), Austrian politician

== Fictional characters ==
- Baron Helmut Schnitzelnazi, from the comedy skit Key & Peele
- Baron Helmut Zemo, fictional character in the Marvel Comics universe
- Helmut Grokenberger, fictional character in the 1991 film Night on Earth
- Helmut Heindenburg, fictional character in 1996 Colombian telenovela Guajira
- Helmut Kruger, fictional fashion model in the video game Hitman (2016)
- Helmut Spargle, a character from Futurama
- Helmut, fictional character in the video game Road Rash
- Iron Cross (Helmut Gruler), fictional character in the Marvel Comics universe

== See also ==
- Hellmuth
- Helmuth
