= Berg Brauerei =

Brewery in Ehingen, Germany

- Location: 89584 Ehingen-Berg, Germany Brauhausstraße 2
- Coordinates: 48°15′45″N 9°44′7″E
- Opened: 1466
- Key people: Ulrich Zimmermann
- Annual production volume: 30,000 hectolitres (26,000 US bbl)
- Website: bergbier.de

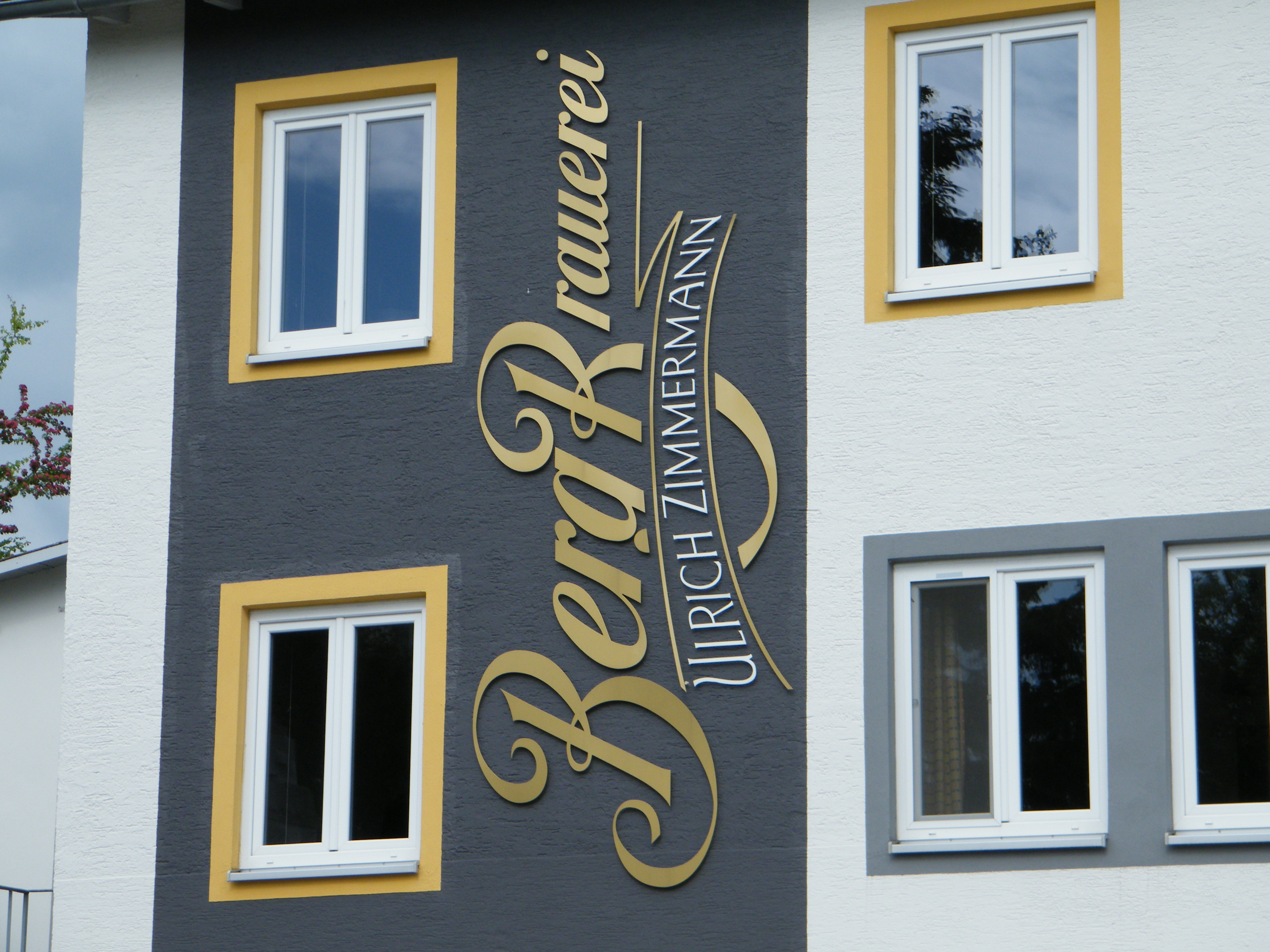
Berg Brauerei

Berg Brauerei is a traditional brewery located in Berg suburb of Ehingen town in Baden-Württemberg, Germany.

== History ==
On 12 July 1466 the "Wirtshaus auf dem Berg" ("inn on the mountain") is mentioned in a letter from the Sigismund, Archduke of Austria as the "inn with the right to bake, boil and other butcher’s goods". Since 1757, the Berg Brauerei has been a family property, now in its 9th generation.

In 2016 the company celebrated its 550th anniversary.

== Products ==
The annual production is about 30,000 hectoliters including:

- all-year beers:
  - Berg Original
  - Bert 3 - grain yeast wheat
  - Berg Special
  - Braumeister Pils, etc.
- seasonal beers:
  - Berg Marzen
  - Herbsgold
  - Berg Weihnachtsbier, etc.

== See also ==
- List of oldest companies
