= Lauterach (Württemberg) =

- Municipality
- Coat of arms

- Location of Lauterach within Alb-Donau-Kreis district
- Interactive map of Lauterach
- Location within Germany Location within Baden-Württemberg
- Coordinates: 48°15′20″N 9°34′54″E
- Country: Germany
- State: Baden-Württemberg
- Admin. region: Tübingen
- District: Alb-Donau-Kreis

Government
  - Mayor (2020–28): Bernhard Ritzler

Area
  - Total: 13.76 km^{2} (5.31 sq mi)
- Elevation: 518 m (1,699 ft)

Population (2025-12-31)
  - Total: 596
  - Density: 43.3/km^{2} (112/sq mi)
- Time zone: UTC+01:00 (CET)
  - Summer (DST): UTC+02:00 (CEST)
- Postal codes: 89584
- Dialling codes: 07375
- Vehicle registration: UL
- Website: www.gemeinde-lauterach.de

Lauterach (German pronunciation: [ˈlaʊtəʁax]) is a municipality in the district of Alb-Donau in Baden-Württemberg in Germany. It is located at the edge of the Swabian Jura, where the Great Lauter flows into the Danube, about 35 km southwest of Ulm.

The municipality borders in the north and east on Ehingen, in the south on Untermarchtal and Obermarchtal, as well as in the west on Rechtenstein and Emeringen. In addition to Lauterach, the community also includes the districts of Neuburg, Talheim and Reichenstein.

== History ==
Lauterach, whose name is derived from the river name Lauter, was first mentioned in 1229. After various changing dominions, the area finally reached Württemberg in 1803 (except for Talheim, which followed in 1806). With the establishment of the Oberamt Zwiefalten in 1809, the present day community area was assigned to it, but by 1810 it had already been transferred to the Oberamt Ehingen. Since the communal reorganization in 1938, Lauterach belonged to the administrative district of Ehingen, which merged into the Alb-Danube district on 1 January 1973. In 1973, the municipality joined the Munderkingen administrative community and was thus able to maintain its independence.

== Demographics ==
Population development:

Year	Inhabitants
1990	668
2001	615
2011	565
2021	603

== Main sights ==
- Burg Reichenstein (Reichenstein castle ruins)
- Mühlenweiler Laufenmühle, in the Lauter valley with a small open-air museum. The preserved tuff stone sawing machine reminds of the limestone sinter mining in the Lauter valley.

=== Gallery ===
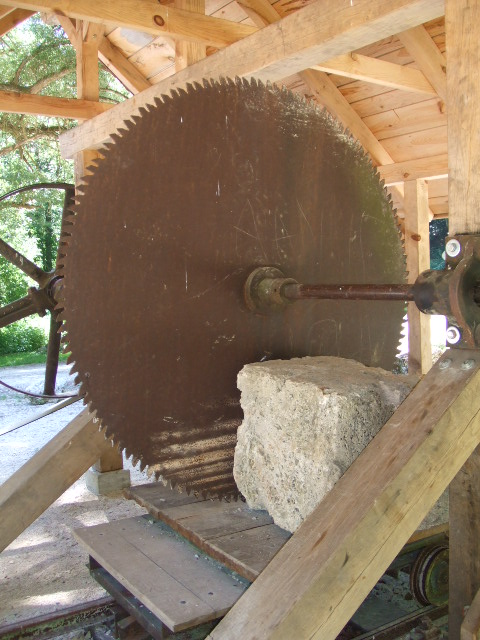
Stone sawmill

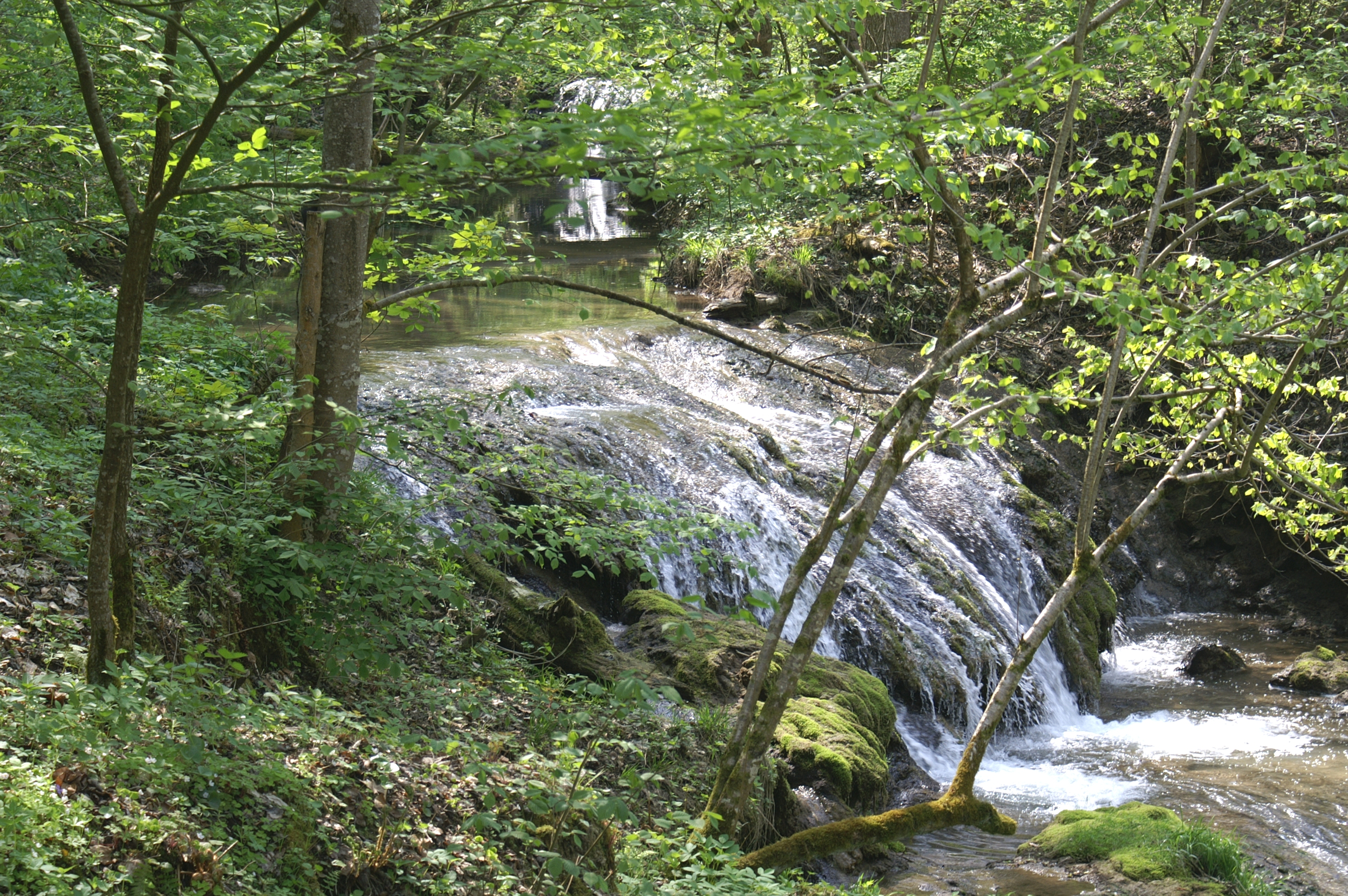
Lauterfall

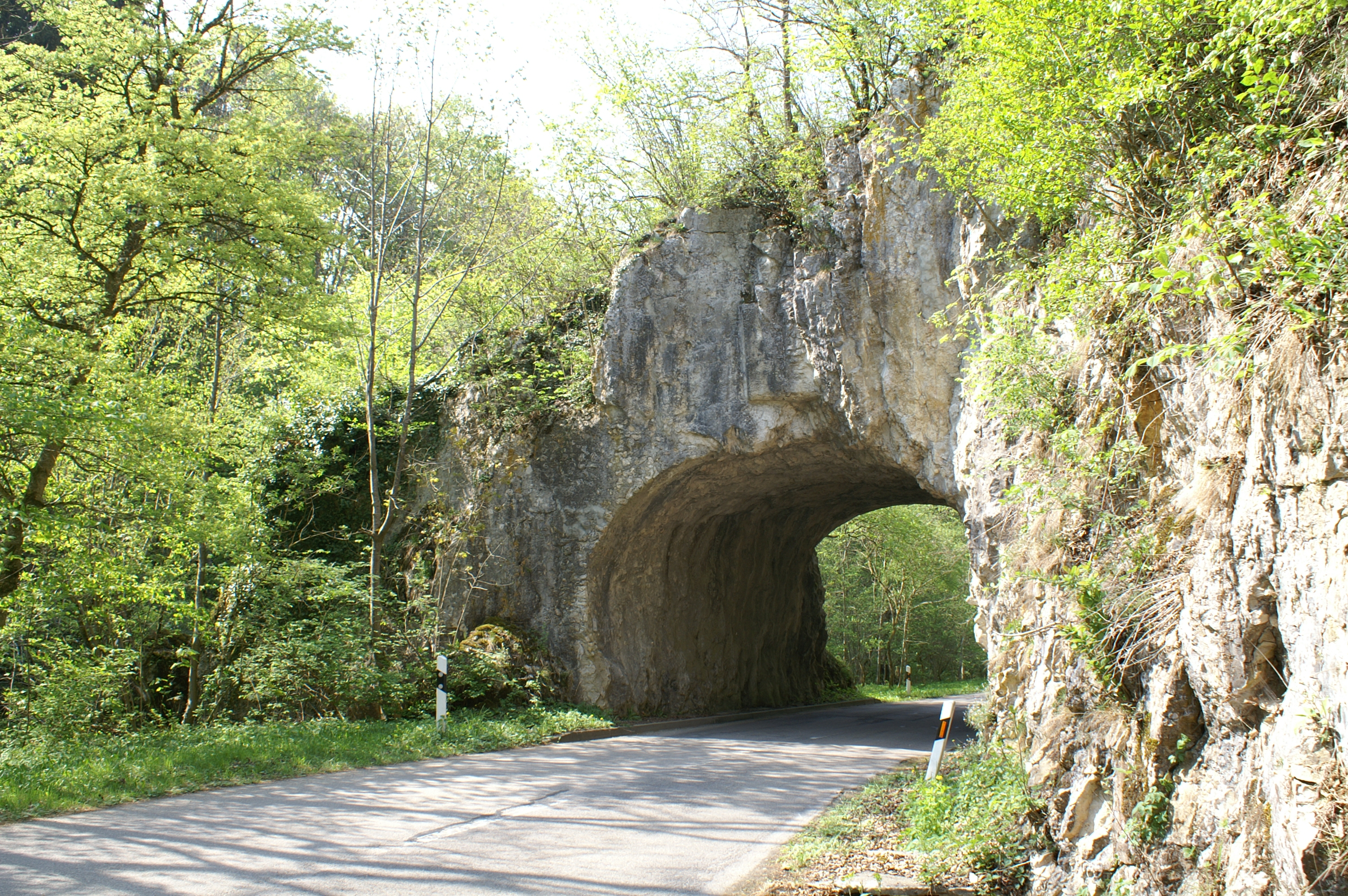
Lauter valley near Lauterach

== See also ==
- Alb-Leisa, traditional Swabian varieties of lentils produced in Lauterach
- Brenntar
