= Lauter (Danube) =

River in Baden-Württemberg, Germany

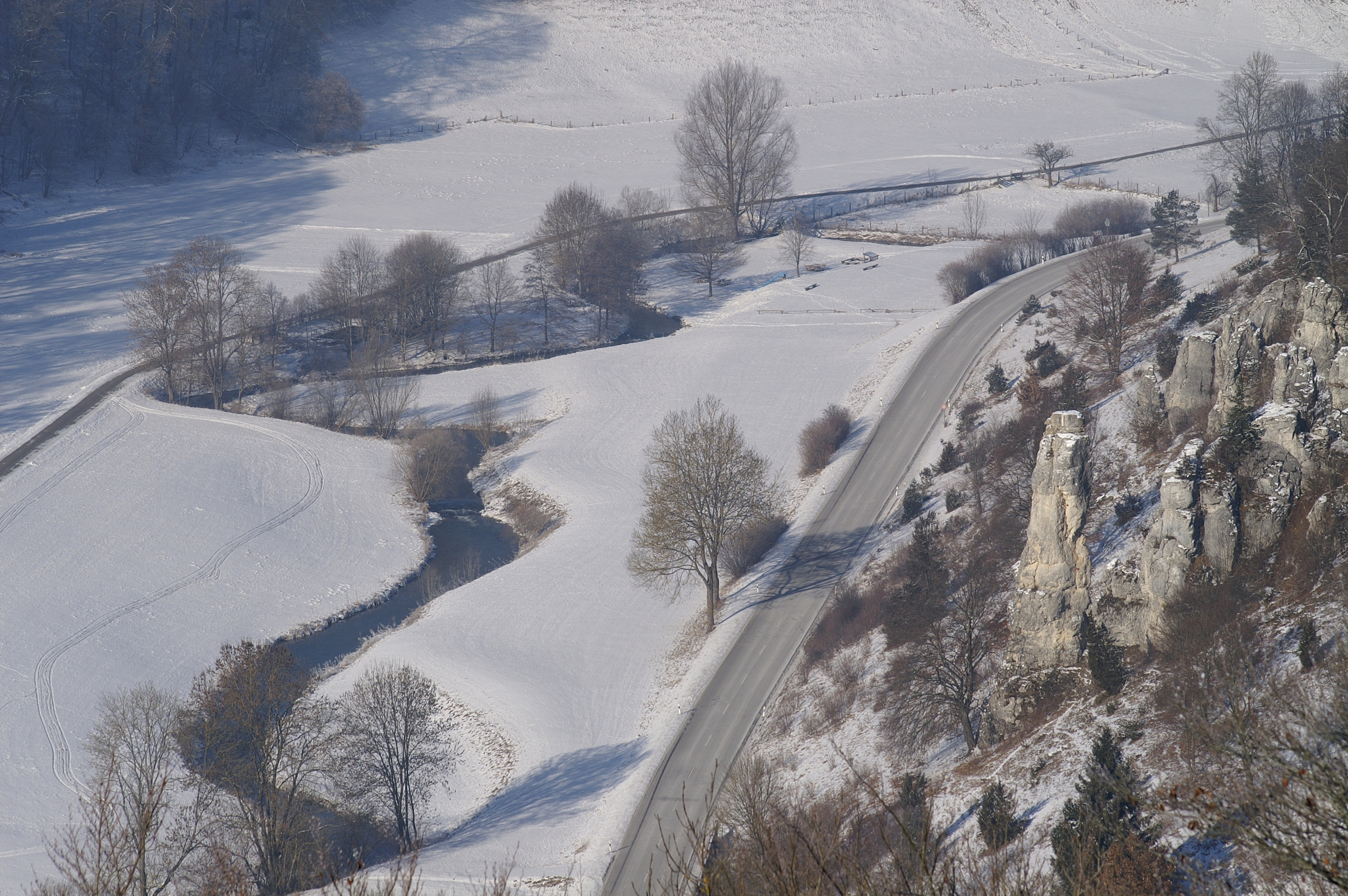
- The Lauter between Bichishausen and Gundelfingen

Location
- Country: Germany
- State: Baden-Württemberg

Physical characteristics
- Mouth
  - location: Danube
  - coordinates: 48.2444°N 9.5817°E
- Length: 42.3 km (26.3 mi)
- Basin size: 327 km^{2} (126 sq mi)

Basin features
- Progression: Danube→ Black Sea

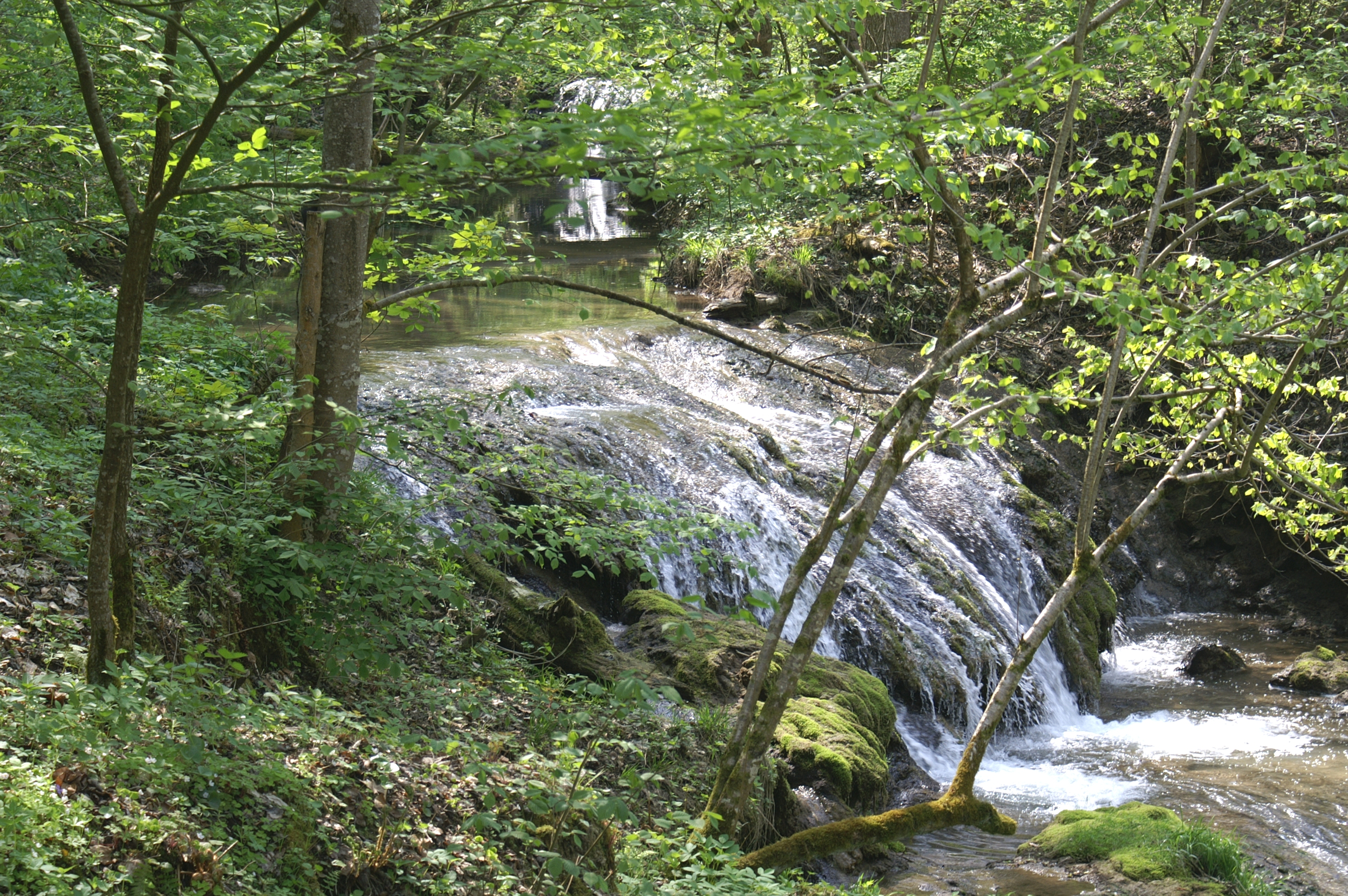
Lauterfall at the Laufenmühle in Lauterach

The Lauter (German pronunciation: [ˈlaʊtɐ]), also known as Große Lauter (lit. 'Big Lauter'), is a small river of the Swabian Alb, Baden-Württemberg, Germany. Its karst spring is inside the walls of the former nunnery at "Offenhausen", a small settlement near Gomadingen. The river discharges into the Danube after 42 km. The river has a long geological history since late Miocene. Although the Swabian Alb is heavily karstified, this river's water runs aboveground all the way.

The municipality of Lauterach is named after the river Lauter.

== Main sights ==
In addition to the untouched nature and the numerous castles and ruins, there are other places of interest, such as the main and country stud farm of Marbach with its world-famous horse breeding, the baroque cathedral Münster Unserer Lieben Frau in Zwiefalten, the Wimsener cave that can be navigated by boat or the former military training area in Münsingen. Since 2004, the Matthias Erzberger Memorial has been located in the district of Buttenhausen in Münsingen.

== Tributaries ==
- Gächinger Lauter (left, near Gomadingen)
- Schörzbach (left, in Gomadingen)
- Dolderbach (left, Marbach an der Lauter)
- Lauterle (right, near Wasserstetten)
- Roßbach (left, in Buttenhausen)
- Blaubrunnen (left, between Anhausen and Unterwilzingen)
- (Inflow from the Schneiderstal) (right, ahead of Unterwilzingen)
- Tiefentalbach (right, between Wittsteig and Weiler)
- Brünnelesbächle (left, just ahead of Lauterach)

== Water sports ==
The Lauter is a popular canoe waterway with different levels of difficulty. Above Buttenhausen the river is closed all year round, from Buttenhausen to Unterwilzingen in the period from March 15 to June 30. Exceptional approvals for individual drivers can be granted by the Naturschutzbehörde Ulm (nature conservation authority Ulm) for the section Anhausen to Unterwilzingen. Organized rides, commercial rentals and events require a year-round permit.

In order to avoid over-exploitation of the water body, it is not permitted to drive on weekends and public holidays between Buttenhausen and Anhausen from 1 July to 30 September. Furthermore, there are minimum and maximum values for the water level for the traffic: In Indelhausen at the grain mill 30 cm is the minimum level, a minimum level of 45 cm is recommended. For the section between Unterwilzingen and the mouth of the Danube, a pass at a level of 75 cm and more at Lauterach is not permitted.

== See also ==
- List of rivers of Baden-Württemberg
