= Anton Schlecker =

German businessman (born 1944)

- Born: 28 October 1944 (age 81); Ehingen, Germany
- Occupation: Businessman
- Years active: 1975–2012
- Known for: Founder of Schlecker drugstore chain
- Notable work: Schlecker drugstore chain
- Criminal charges: Fraud (1998), bankruptcy fraud (2017)
- Criminal penalty: 10-month suspended sentence, €1 million fine (1998); two-year suspended sentence, €54,000 fine (2017)
- Spouse: Christa Schlecker
- Children: Lars Schlecker, Meike Schlecker

Anton Kut Schlecker (born 28 October 1944, in Ehingen) is a German businessman, founder and owner of the Schlecker drug store chain in Germany.

He is married to Christa Schlecker and has two children, Lars Schlecker and Meike Schlecker, both active in the management of the Schlecker company.

At the age of 21, he acquired the degree "Meister" butcher and took over the parental butcher's shop. In 1975, he built his first drug store in Kirchheim unter Teck which went up to more than 100 stores two years later. As of 2003, there were more than 13,000 stores across Europe, employing about 50,000 people and generating revenue of about €6.55 billion.

In July 2012, Anton Schlecker and his family declared bankruptcy and all Schlecker stores closed and were sold off to the appointed receivers.

== Schlecker kidnapping ==
In 1987, his two children – Meike and Lars – were kidnapped, released only after he paid 9.6 million marks in ransom. In summer 1998, Wilhelm Hudelmaier and Herbert Jacoby were arrested in Ehingen and convicted of kidnapping. In 1999, they were convicted by the Landgericht Ulm of kidnapping and extortion. They both were sentenced to a prison term of 13.5 years.

== Court cases ==
In 1998, Schlecker and his wife were given a suspended sentence of ten months each and fined €1 million by the Regional Court in Stuttgart for deceiving Schlecker employees into believing they were paid according to going pay rates. Actual salaries were lower, which was deemed fraud by the court.

Following the bankruptcy of his drug store chain during which he illegally abstracted assets worth several million euros to the credit of his children, Schlecker was convicted of bankruptcy fraud and was given a suspended sentence of two years and fined €54,000.
