= Helmuth =

Stolperstein in Eckernförde for Helmuth Kock

Helmuth is both a masculine German given name and a surname. Notable people with the name include:

== Given name ==
- Helmuth Theodor Bossert (1889–1961), German art historian, philologist and archaeologist
- Helmuth Hübener (1925–1942), German opponent of the Third Reich
- Helmuth Lehner (born 1968), Austrian musician
- Helmuth Lohner (1933–2015), Austrian actor and theatre director
- Helmuth Markov (born 1952), German politician
- Helmuth von Moltke (disambiguation), several people
- Helmuth Nyborg (born 1937), Danish professor at Aarhus University
- Helmuth von Pannwitz (1898–1947), German SS Cossack Cavalry Corps officer executed for war crimes
- Helmuth Plessner (1892–1985), German philosopher and sociologist
- Helmuth Rilling (1933–2026), German conductor
- Helmuth von Ruckteschell (1890–1948), German navy officer
- Helmuth Schneider (1920–1972), German actor
- Helmuth Schwenn (1913–1983), German water polo player
- Helmuth Søbirk (1916–1992), Danish amateur footballer
- Helmuth Stieff (1901–1944), German general and member of the OKH
- Helmuth Ternberg (1893–1971), Swedish intelligence officer
- Helmuth Weidling (1891–1955), German Army office

== Surname ==
- Frits Helmuth (1931–2004), Danish actor
- Justus Christian Henry Helmuth (1745–1824), German-American Lutheran clergyman
- Osvald Helmuth (1894–1966), Danish stage and film actor and revue singer; father of Frits Helmuth

== See also ==
- HMS Helmuth, a Royal Navy armed tug
- Helmuth, a villain in E. E. Smith's Galactic Patrol (novel)
- Hellmuth
- Helmut
