= Swedish Ido Association =

Swedish Ido Association was founded in Stockholm 21 April 1911 and was associated with Uniono por la linguo internaciona - ULI. The purpose was to promote the usage of the universal Ido language in Sweden.

During the 1930s the Swedish Ido Association was one of the largest associations in Sweden that advocated the usage of a universal language. The association had about 200 exercising and 100 supporting members. The association published periodicals and literature in Ido. Among other periodicals Komuniki (1964–1988) Svensk Världsspråkstidning 1925-59 and Mondo 1912-34 can be mentioned.

Due to receding numbers of members, an extra general meeting decided to dissolve the association in Stockholm 2 August 1996. At this meeting the Ido-foundation for Language Research in Memory of Hellmut Röhnisch was created using the assets of the association. Hellmut Röhnisch was the last chairman of the Swedish Ido Association.
