= Mixture theory =

Mixture theory is used to model multiphase systems using the principles of continuum mechanics generalised to several interpenetrable continua. The basic assumption is that, at any instant of time, all phases are present at every material point, and momentum and mass balance equations are postulated. Like other models, mixture theory requires constitutive relations to close the system of equations. Krzysztof Wilmanski extended the model by introducing a balance equation of porosity.
