= Rita von Gaudecker =

German author

Rita von Gaudecker (born Rita von Blittersdorf: 14 April 1879 – 18 March 1968) was a German author who produced many books for children and young people, also contributing on religious topics. She also became engaged in social work, founding the "Helferbund Rita von Gaudecker" welfare support organisation in 1945.

== Life ==
Rita Margarethe Klara Alexandra von Blittersdorf was born, the eighth of her parents' nine recorded children, in Molstow, a village near Greifenberg (as it was called before the ethnic cleansing of 1944/45) in East Pomerania. Her father, Carl Freiherr von Blittersdorf, was a minor aristocrat. Her mother, Ada Freiin von Behr, died from scarlet fever in March 1885, when she was not quite six. Her father never recovered from the blow, but she and her siblings nevertheless had a happy childhood. Looking back, she would later write: "What a truly untroubled existence a rural child has. Alongside the villagers, all the farm animals and the whole of nature. Gathering the unknowing powers of all these. Powers to defend and to transgress."

Her Confirmation was followed by years as a "house daughter". Till 1906, when her youngest sister married, she took responsibility for running the household. Along with this, in 1914 she took charge of the "Kapellenverein Youth Association", also running its magazine, "Wir wollen Helfen!" ("We want to help!"). From these beginnings, she occupied herself ever more as a writer, especially for children and young people. Her autobiographical children's book "Unter der Molstower Linde" ("Under the Molstow Linden Tree"), published in 1920, became a great success, and was still in print in the 1960s. Her religious works for children and Confirmation candidates also enjoyed great respect. These included "Weißt du, wieviel Sternlein stehen? Fünfzig Kinderandachten" ("Do you know how many little stars there are? 50 children's devotions"), based on "Weißt du, wieviel Sternlein stehen" and published in 1930, "So nimm denn meine Hände. Fünfzig Kinderandachten" ("So take my hands: fifty children's devotions"), based on "So nimm denn meine Hände" and published in 1933 and "Jesu, geh voran! Fünfzig Kinderandachten" ("Go forth Jesus: fifty children's devotions"), based on "Jesu, geh voran" and published in 1936. She also involved herself more generally in the affairs of the "Kapellenverein" a religious welfare organisation founded in Berlin in 1885, by Bertha von Kröcher to attend to the spiritual needs of impoverished workers from the east of Germany. The Kapellenverein had been concerning itself with child labour, and taking care of homeless and abusively treated children.

On 13 April 1914 Rita von Blittersdorf married the naval officer Gerhard Jobst August Moritz von Gaudecker. The marriage remained childless. After being stationed successively in Kiel, Constantinople and Wilhelmshaven the couple moved back to Pomerania. Here Rita von Gaudecker looked after what became a small network of several orphanages operated under the auspices of the Kapellenverein, the first of which had been relocated from Berlin to (Dźwirzyno (known as Kolberger Deep in German) during the winter of 1916/17. A second orphanage was established in 1920/21 to look after the children of officers who had been killed in the recent war. Rita von Gaudecker was also in charge of a children's home in a house bequeathed to the Kapellenverein along Park Street Kolberg, where the focus was on children from villages who needed to be in the town in order to be able to attend school. For the younger children the establishment ran its own school under the direction of Rita von Gaudecker, helped by mostly young volunteers from the Christian organisation. Fund raising was a constant preoccupation, which she achieved both by personal visits to individual groups and using circular letters. Captain von Gaudecker kept the accounts.

The change of government in January 1933 heralded a rapid and ultimately disastrous transition to a one-party dictatorship in Germany. It was far from easy to continue as before with the private running of a Christian children's home, with a shared Christian focus and frequent regular Christian worship. There was one senior Nazi who had once been a young helper at the home who was able to provide a level of protection. Nevertheless, the older children were obliged to join the Hitler Youth and then, following the outbreak of World War II in 1939, to become soldiers. Many came back from the front to spend any periods of army leave at Dźwirzyno, but by the time the war ended, formally in May 1945, many had been killed in the fighting. At the start of 1945, with the expulsion of Germans underway in the former eastern territories of Germany, the children were able to escape to Mecklenburg. They were then sent back, however, and survived for a few more months in Dźwirzyno which was now being inundated with refugees being forced out of Eastern Germany in order to make space for Polish refugees being forced out of what had previously been eastern Poland. In Dźwirzyno, as the Soviet armies over-ran the region, the dangers facing the von Gaudeckers, now in their mid-sixties, were doubled on account of their aristocratic provenance (and name) and because Captain von Gaudecker was a retired army officer. They fled or were expelled from Dźwirzyno and until October 1945 survived hunger and sickness in the Berlin suburb of Treptow.

From Berlin they moved to Holstein where they stayed till 1950 when they moved to stay with distant relatives on the other side of the country, in Allmendingen (south of Ulm). Here Captain von Gaudecker, who had been in poor health for some time, died in 1954, while Rita was hospitalised with a broken hip, after which she was never again able to use stairs. Meanwhile, she had already, in 1945, founded the "Helferbund vom Kapellenverein", dedicated to the causes for which she had always worked, and while there were no longer children's homes, she had still been able to organise food parcels. After becoming immobilised in 1954 she seldom left her "large room in the tower" at her relatives' property in Allmendingen, but she remained energetic with her pen. In 1965 she finally retired from her chairmanship of the Helferbund which shortly afterwards was renamed as the "Verein in Helferbund Rita von Gaudecker e. V.", the name under which it still exists.

Rita von Gaudecker died at the hospital in Ehingen, a couple of miles to the south of Allmendingen, on 18 March 1968.

== Published output ==
(not necessarily a complete list)

- Unter der Molstower Linde. Braunschweig 1920
- Vom Prinzeßchen, das nicht einschlafen konnte. Braunschweig 1921
- Breit aus die Flügel beide! Fünfzig Kinderandachten. Potsdam 1927
- Die Brücke. Stuttgart 1930
- Vom Fischerdorf zur Ottenburg. Potsdam 1931
- Der Weg zur Marie. Hamburg 1932
- So nimm denn meine Hände. Fünfzig Kinderandachten. Potsdam 1933
- Der Weihnachtsgast. Hamburg 1936
- Jesu geh voran! Fünfzig Kinderandachten. Potsdam 1936
- Der Onkel aus Holland. Schwerin 1937
- An nuer Küste. Hamburg 1938
- Nacht am Berg. Gütersloh 1947
- Die alte Laterne. Bielefeld 1954
- Auf Gottes Acker. Bielefeld 1963

== Honour ==
- 1964 Order of Merit of the Federal Republic of Germany
