= Envy: A Theory of Social Behavior =

1966 book by Helmut Schoeck

Envy: A Theory of Social Behavior is a monograph by the Austrian-German sociologist Helmut Schoeck. It was first published in German version as Der Neid: Eine Theorie der Gesellschaft in 1966, and first translated into English in 1969. Schoeck was a polemicist against the New Left movements of the 1960s, and used the book to criticize their ideas from a conservative-liberal viewpoint.

== Thesis ==
The primary subject of the book is the origin and social function of envy. Schoeck describes the role of envy in a wide range of contexts, including examples from literature, philosophy, and social science. His argument contains two propositions: first, that envy has played a large part in forming human society, and that, secondly, the role of envy often remains hidden. Schoeck also argues that as envy is a natural part of human evolution and cannot be suppressed, it is important to channel the emotion. He suggests that socialism and democracy were put forward as ideas by members of society who were not able "to deal with their own envy", and Karl Marx's idea of primitive communism was "entirely mistaken". In his view, socialism misguidedly seeks to eliminate envy by eliminating poverty, an aim that is both impossible and (given the useful social function of envy) undesirable.

== Reception ==
Written without much technical jargon, the book received widespread appreciation, even outside the academic community. The book became somewhat of a bestseller, and was translated into more than ten languages. A review in the American Anthropologist expressed skepticism about the thoroughness of Schoeck's research, despite the promise of his thesis.
