= Helmut Schoeck =

Austrian-German sociologist and writer

Helmut Schoeck (3 July 1922 – 2 February 1993) was an Austrian-German sociologist and writer best known for his work Envy: A Theory of Social Behavior (Der Neid: Eine Theorie der Gesellschaft).

== Life ==
Born in Graz, Schoeck spent his early years in Baden-Württemberg, finishing high school in Ludwigsburg. He then studied medicine, philosophy and psychology at the Ludwig-Maximilians-Universität München and the University of Tübingen. With a dissertation on Karl Mannheim, Schoeck would obtain his doctorate under Eduard Spranger.

For fifteen years, starting in 1950, Schoeck would work as a professor at various U.S. universities. In 1953, he taught philosophy at Fairmont State College, followed by a two-year stint at Yale. At Emory University he was awarded a full professorship in sociology. During the 1950s, Schoeck published some works in German, and translated Joachim Wach's Sociology of Religion into German.

In 1965, Schoeck returned to Germany, where he obtained a chair in sociology at the University of Mainz, which he would occupy until his retirement in 1990.

Schoeck, who was also a columnist of the Welt am Sonntag for twenty years, died of cancer in 1993.

== Works (selected) ==
- Karl Mannheim als Wissenssoziologe, Dissertation, 1948
- Nietzsches Philosophie des „Menschlich-Allzumenschlichen“. Kritische Darstellung der Aphorismen-Welt der mittleren Schaffenszeit als Versuch einer Neuorientierung des Gesamtbildes, 1948
- Soziologie. Geschichte ihrer Probleme. 1952. 2., wesentlich überarbeitete und erweiterte Auflage unter dem Titel Die Soziologie und die Gesellschaften. Problemsicht und Problemlösung von Beginn bis zur Gegenwart. 1964. Orbis academicus Band I/3. Verlag Karl Alber, Freiburg / München
- USA. Motive und Strukturen, 1958
- Was heißt politisch unmöglich?, 1959
- Scientism and Values, 1960
- Relativism and the Study of Man, 1961
- Financing Medical Care, 1962
- Psychiatry and Responsibility, 1962
- Der Neid. Eine Theorie der Gesellschaft. Verlag Karl Alber, Freiburg/München 1966, 2. Auflage 1968 (späterer Titel: Der Neid und die Gesellschaft)
- Kleines soziologisches Wörterbuch, 1969 (ab 1971: Soziologisches Wörterbuch)
- Ist Leistung unanständig?, 1971 (mehrmals erweitert)
- Vorsicht Schreibtischtäter. Politik und Presse in der Bundesrepublik, 1972
- Entwicklungshilfe. Politische Humanität, 1972
- Die Lust am schlechten Gewissen, 1973
- Das Geschäft mit dem Pessimismus, 1975
- Schülermanipulation, 1976
- Das Recht auf Ungleichheit, 1979
- Der Arzt zwischen Politik und Patient, 1983
- Die zwölf Irrtümer unseres Jahrhunderts, 1985
- Kinderverstörung. Die mißbrauchte Kindheit - Umschulung auf eine andere Republik, 1989
