= Schlecker =

Former German drugstore retail chain

- Company type: Sole proprietorship
- Industry: Retail
- Founded: 1975
- Defunct: 2012
- Headquarters: Ehingen (Donau), Deutschland, Germany
- Area served: Germany, Austria, Czech Republic, Luxembourg, Belgium, Hungary, Poland, France, Spain, Italy.
- Key people: Anton Schlecker, Lars Schlecker and Meike Schlecker
- Products: Cosmetics, healthcare, household products, photo developing and food
- Services: Business services,
- Revenue: € 4.748 billion (2010/2011) EUR (2010)
- Number of employees: 25,000 (September 2008)
- Website: www.schlecker.de

Schlecker was a German retail company with headquarters in Ehingen which once had a workforce of some 52,000. There were stores across Europe including Germany, Austria, the Czech Republic, Luxembourg, Portugal, Poland, France, Spain and Italy. Schlecker announced the closure of half its shops across Germany with effect from 29 February 2012. Due to bankruptcy, the remaining stores were closed on 27 June of that year, with the exception of the 'XL' markets and the businesses of associated 'Ihr Platz' brand.

== History ==
=== Founding and first years ===
In 1967, Anton Schlecker opened the first market ("Schleckerland") in Ehingen. Further openings followed in Neu-Ulm, Geislingen an der Steige, Göppingen and Schwäbisch Gmünd. When fixed prices for branded goods were declared inadmissible in 1974, he opened his first drugstore in Kirchheim unter Teck the following year. In 1977, Schlecker already operated more than 100 drugstores. He increased the number of branches until 1984 to 1,000 and was considered the market leader from 1994.

=== Expansion ===
Following recent successes, Schlecker expanded all over Germany. In 1987, the company further expanded internationally, first opening stores in Austria and in 1989 in the Netherlands and Spain. By taking over the French company "Superdrug", Schlecker was able to gain a foothold in France in 1991. In the year 1999 Schlecker also established locations in Italy, in 2004 stores in Poland and Denmark. 2005 locations in the Czech Republic and Hungary were opened, as well as 2006 in Portugal. Whilst countries like Austria and Spain became important international markets for Schlecker, some start-up attempts in other countries failed.

The married couple Anton and Christa Schlecker were sentenced in 1998 by the Stuttgart Regional Court to a suspended prison sentence of ten months each and a fine of €1 million because Schlecker employees were deceived into believing that they were being paid according to the collective agreement. In fact, the wages were lower, which the court ruled as fraud.

=== Development from 2000 to 2010 ===
Schlecker expanded its business not only through expansion, but also through acquisitions. The Rewe Group's 240 Sconti stores were taken over in 2001. In 2005, Schlecker integrated 91 branches of the drugstore chain "idea" - the green drugstore of the Rewe Group - into its own branch network. At the end of 2006, Schlecker took over the leading Czech drugstore chain Droxi, which had belonged to the Feinkosthaus Julius Meinl. On 31 December 2007, Schlecker acquired the former competitor "Ihr Platz" for €150 million and continued to operate it as a premium second brand. Almost 100 larger Schlecker branches are also said to have operated under Ihr Platz. At the end of August 2009, the Federal Cartel Office approved the takeover of a maximum of 71 former Woolworth stores.

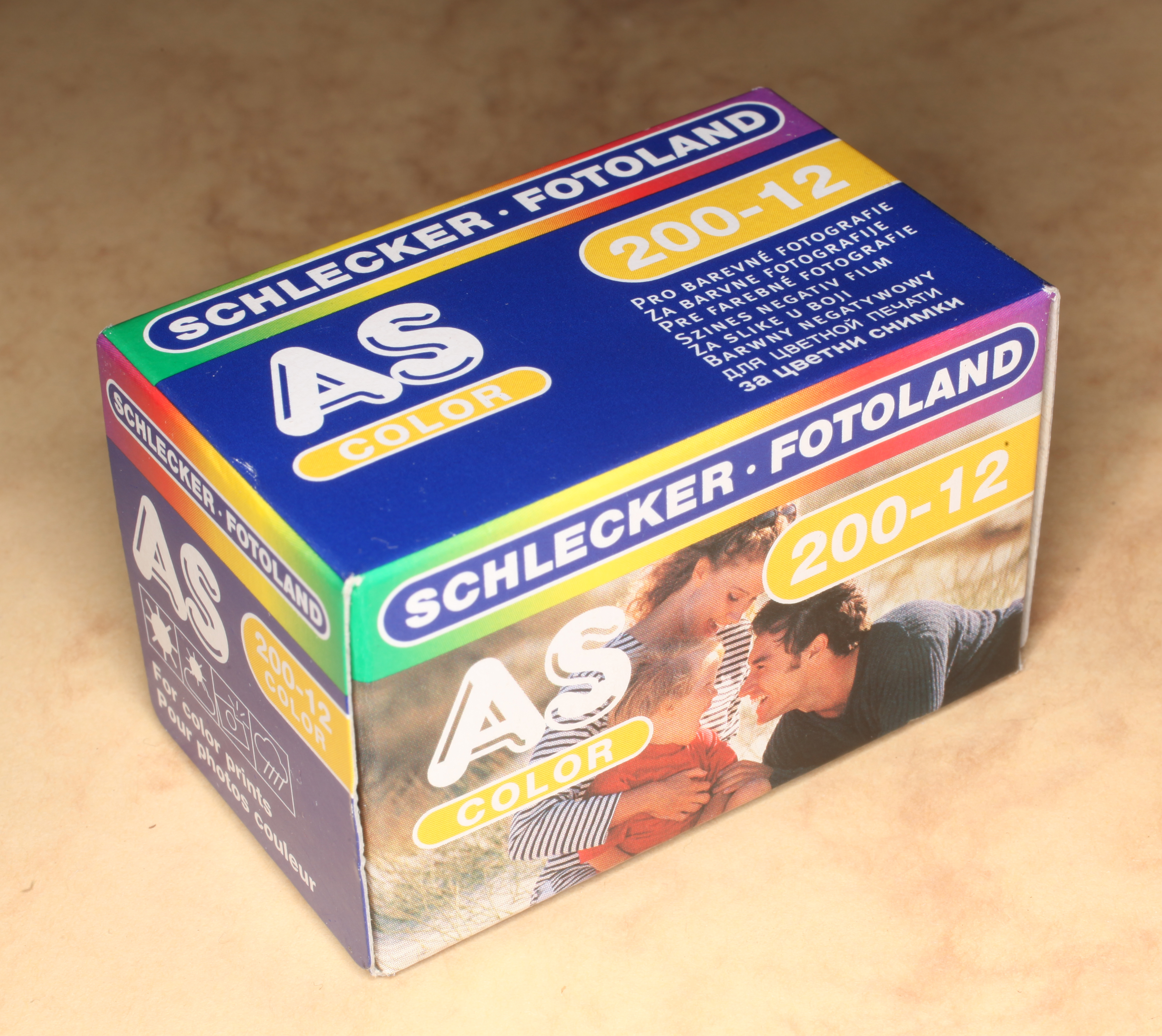
A Schlecker-Fotoland private label photographic film

The Schlecker Home Shopping online shop was opened in 2000 and, according to the company, its range included 100,000 items. The items in the range were also sold through a regularly updated catalog. A new logistics center near Ehingen-Berg was put into operation in 2004 for the shipping business. In a representative customer survey by the Federal Association of the German Mail Order Trade, the online shop was voted one of the best shopping addresses on the Internet in the "Cosmetics Drugstore" category in 2009.

From mid-2007, Schlecker was active in the wholesale business and bought for other retailers. This should have made better use of the company's logistics and further reduced the purchasing prices of the items through the increase in volume, it was thought.

From February 2008, Schlecker ran the "Vitalsana" mail-order pharmacy in Heerlen, the Netherlands.

In 2008, more than 14,000 branches across Europe with around 50,000 employees generated annual sales of over €7 billion.

On 1 January 2010, the Kaufland retail chain, which is part of the Schwarz Group, took over four of the five Schleckerland self-service department stores, converting them to the Kaufland-concept. The Schleckerland Neu-Ulm, on the other hand, was reopened as a shopping center with a Schlecker XL market, as Kaufland already had two branches there at that time. On 21 January 2010, Schlecker announced that it would close around 500 branches in 2010 due to "business problems".

In August 2010, a data leak at a Bonn IT service provider became known. Data sets from 150,000 Schlecker customers were publicly accessible on the Internet due to a security hole. According to data leak discoverer Tobias Huch, Schlecker was not responsible for the leak. The data leak was closed immediately after it was discovered. The records included the customer's name, address, email address and their customer profile. In addition, the email addresses of 7.1 million newsletter subscribers were accessible. Schlecker filed a criminal complaint against unknown people and offered affected customers a €5 shopping voucher. In addition, improvements to security standards were initiated.

In October 2010, the Schlecker works councils in the Mayen and Fürth/Herzogenaurach districts were awarded the 2010 German Works Council Gold Award.

In mid-November 2010, Lars and Meike Schlecker, Anton Schlecker's children and who had been working for the company for ten years, announced that they would now be responsible for the company's external image. By mid-2012, €230 million should have been invested to make the branches more competitive.

=== Developments from 2011 ===
From the beginning of 2011, Schlecker used a new logo developed by the design agency KW43 Branddesign, which is part of the Düsseldorf Gray Group.

In January 2011, Schlecker announced a change to the internal management structure as part of the Fit for Future future and investment program. As the second management level below the owner family, a board level with Thorben Rusch was appointed for purchasing, marketing and sales. In addition to these two newly structured areas, staff departments (e.g. for real estate, personnel development and corporate communications) continued to report directly to the Schlecker family. The new management structure was supposed to make it easier for Lars Schlecker and Meike Schlecker to manage the company. It was a novelty for Schlecker that Sami Sagur, a manager who had recently joined the company from outside, was given such a prominent leadership position. The Fit for Future program, developed with the help of external consultants, was intended to lead to extensive repositioning, improve the image and develop Schlecker into a modern local supplier. This was supposed to be achieved through profound changes to the product range and shop design as well as to communication and marketing.

On 21 January 2011, it was announced that Thorben Rusch would become Schlecker's new COO, with Sami Sagur taking the post of CFO.

Schlecker filed for bankruptcy on 23 January 2012 although it was announced that business would continue during the bankruptcy process. 104 markets of the Ihr Platz subsidiary were taken over by Schlecker's competitor Rossmann.

== Literature ==
- Sarah Bormann: Angriff auf die Mitbestimmung. Unternehmensstrategien gegen Betriebsräte – der Fall Schlecker. Edition Sigma, Berlin 2007, ISBN 978-3-8360-8685-1.
- Michael Opoczynski: Die Blutsauger der Nation - Wie ein entfesselter Kapitalismus uns ruiniert. Droemer, ISBN 3-426-27380-2.
- Rüdiger Liedtke: Wem gehört die Republik? Die Konzerne und ihre Verflechtungen in der globalisierten Wirtschaft 2007. Namen Zahlen Fakten. Eichborn Verlags AG, Frankfurt a. M. 2006, ISBN 3-8218-5658-0, S. 375-377.
