= Kyra T. Inachin =

German historian (1968–2012)

- Born: 19 May 1968; New York City, USA
- Died: 10 January 2012 (aged 43)
- Occupation: Historian

Kyra T. Inachin (19 May 1968 – 10 January 2012) was a German historian.

== Biography ==
Kyra T. Inachin was born in New York City and grew up in Lampertheim, West Germany. From 1987 to 1992 she studied history, anglistics and political sciences at the University of Mannheim. She passed her phD in 1995 and worked as an assistant at the chair of Pomeranian history and regional studies at the University of Greifswald. Inachin habilitated in 2002 and worked as a Privatdozent (Professor) since 2008, at the University of Greifswald's historic Institute.

== Publications ==
- Lampertheim in der Weimarer Republik und im Dritten Reich (Diss.; 1995)
- Der Aufstieg der Nationalsozialisten in Pommern. Landeszentrale für politische Bildung Mecklenburg-Vorpommern (Hrsg.), Helms, Schwerin 2002, ISBN 3-935749-14-7.
- Durchbruch zur demokratischen Moderne. Die Landtage von Mecklenburg-Schwerin, Mecklenburg-Strelitz und Pommern während der Weimarer Republik. Edition Temmen, Bremen 2004, ISBN 3-86108-046-X.
- Nationalstaat und regionale Selbstbehauptung. Die preußische Provinz Pommern 1815–1945. In: Quellen und Studien aus den Landesarchiven Mecklenburg-Vorpommerns. Bd. 7, Edition Temmen, Bremen 2005, ISBN 3-86108-052-4. (Habil.)
- Parlamentarierinnen. Landespolitikerinnen in Mecklenburg und Vorpommern 1918 bis heute. Landeszentrale für politische Bildung Mecklenburg-Vorpommern (Hrsg.), Scheunen-Verlag, Kückenshagen 2005, ISBN 3-938398-17-5.
- Von Selbstbehauptung zum Widerstand. Mecklenburger und Pommern gegen den Nationalsozialismus 1933 bis 1945. Landeszentrale für politische Bildung Mecklenburg-Vorpommern (Hrsg.), Scheunen-Verlag, Kückenshagen 2005, ISBN 3-934301-97-5.
- Die Geschichte Pommerns. Hinstorff, Rostock 2008, ISBN 978-3-356-01044-2.
