= Hellmut Röhnisch =

German-born Swedish businessman (1914–1996)

- Born: 1914 Zeitz, German Empire
- Died: 1996 (aged 81–82) Örebro, Sweden

Gymnastics career
- Discipline: Men's artistic gymnastics

Hellmut Röhnisch (1914 – 1996) was a German-born Swedish universal language activist, businessman and athlete.

== Biography ==
Röhnisch went to school in Kassel, Germany. He left Germany with a group of countrymen in 1932. Thus escaping being arrested and prosecuted for his engagement in the German trade union movement in a situation where political circumstances were in turmoil. Röhnisch eventually settled in Örebro in Sweden after travelling, mainly by foot, through Poland, the Baltic states and Finland.

In 1945, Röhnisch won the first ever Swedish Championship in gymnastics. Röhnisch was engaged as a judge and interpreter for competitions in gymnastics in all World Championships and Olympic Games until 1988 in Seoul. For his contributions Röhnisch was awarded an honorary membership of the International Gymnastics Federation (FIG).

In 1945, Röhnisch set up a company specialized in gymnastics apparatus. Eventually the company included sportswear in its offering. The company, Röhnisch Sportswear, is managed by descendants and is since 2002 specialized in sportswear for women. As a child Hellmut Rönnisch learnt Ido from his father Ewald Röhnisch, a leading figure in the German Ido movement. Hellmut Röhnisch was very active in the Ido movement both internationally and in Sweden and served many years as chairman both in the International Union of Ido (ULI) and the Swedish Ido Association.

When the Swedish Ido Association was dissolved in 1996 the assets of the association were used to set up the Ido-foundation for Language Research in Memory of Hellmut Röhnisch. The foundation has since then made important contributions to linguistic science and the universal language movement.
