= Rudolf Schmid (bishop) =

- Titular bishop of Dionysiana
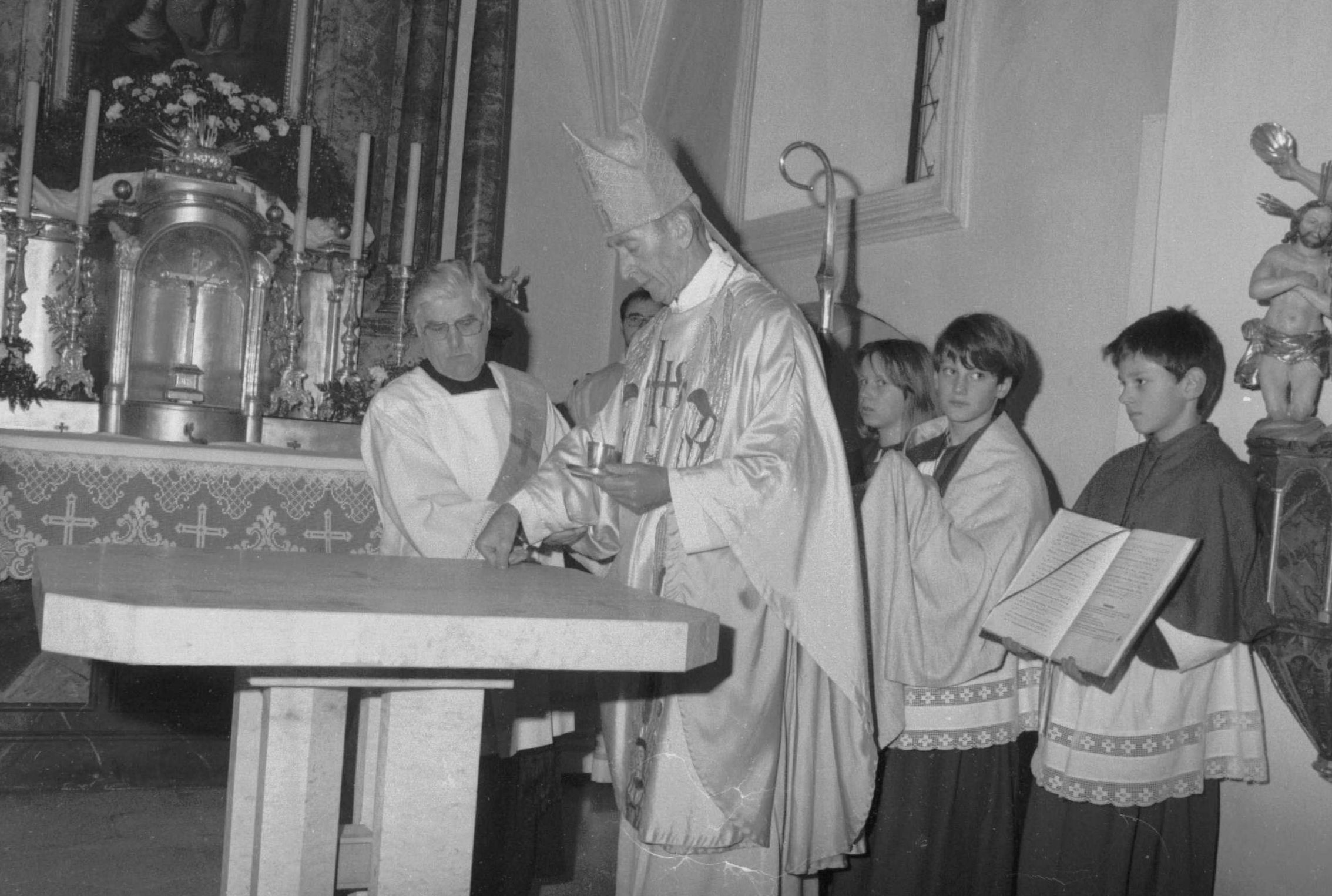
- Consecration of the folk altar in Dinkelshausen with Auxiliary Bishop Rudolf Schmid.
- Church: Roman Catholic Church
- See: Titular see of Dionysiana
- In office: 1972 -present
- Predecessor: Diego Maria Gómez Tamayo
- Successor: none
- Previous posts: Auxiliary bishop of Augsburg Diocese; Bishop

Orders
- Ordination: 26 June 1938

Personal details
- Born: 26 June 1914 Schiers, Switzerland
- Died: 24 June 2012 (aged 97)
- Coat of arms

Rudolf Schmid (26 June 1914 – 24 June 2012) was a German prelate of the Roman Catholic Church.

Schmid was born in Schiers, Switzerland in 1914 and was ordained a priest on 26 June 1938, his 24th birthday, with the Augsburg Diocese. He was chaplain in Murnau until 1945. Then he was chaplain in Augsburg, together with Josef Stimpfle, who was Bishop of Augsburg since 1963. He was appointed Auxiliary Bishop of the Augsburg Diocese on 3 January 1972; he was ordained on 25 March 1972 titular bishop of Dionysiana. Schmid retired from his position of auxiliary bishop of Augsburg on 11 July 1990 because of his age.

Schmid died on 24 June 2012, two days short of his 98th birthday.
