= Alfons Demming =

Roman Catholic bishop

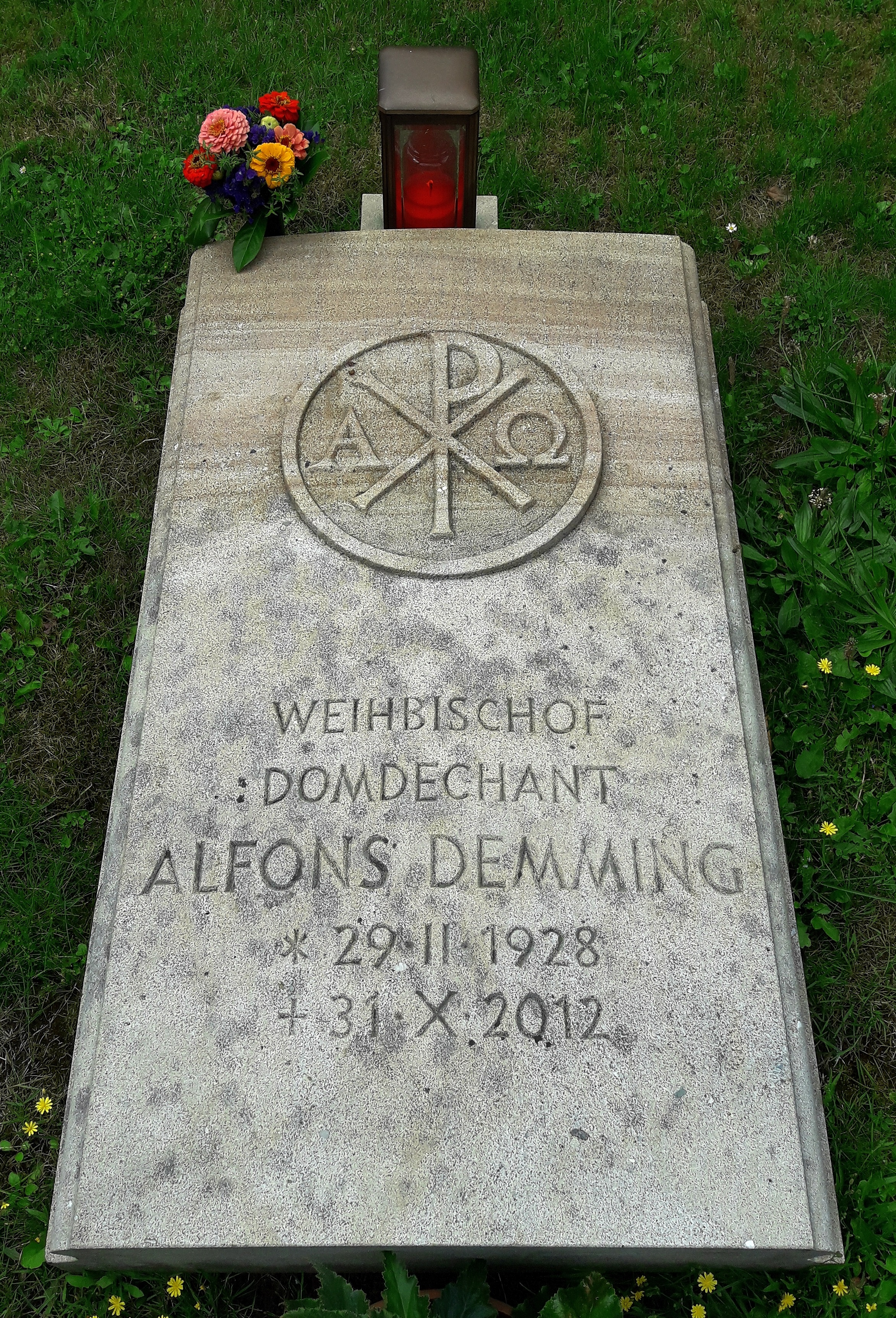
Grave of Alfons Demming

Alfons Demming (29 February 1928 – 31 October 2012) was the Roman Catholic titular bishop of Gordus and auxiliary bishop of the Roman Catholic Diocese of Münster, Germany.

Ordained in 1953, Demming was named bishop in 1976 and resigned in 1998.
