= Paul Consbruch =

Coat of arms of Paul Consbruch.

Paul Consbruch (2 May 1930 – 2 February 2012) was a German Roman Catholic bishop.

Consbruch was born in Gütersloh, Germany. He was consecrated as Auxiliary Roman Catholic Bishop of Paderborn in 1981.

He died on 2 February 2012, as Auxiliary Bishop Emeritus of the Roman Catholic Diocese of Paderborn, from undisclosed causes, aged 81.
