= Helmut Graeb =

German electrical engineer

Helmut Graeb is an electrical engineer at the Technical University of Munich, Germany. Graeb was named a Fellow of the Institute of Electrical and Electronics Engineers (IEEE) in 2014 for his contributions to design centering and structural analysis of analog circuits.
