= Helmuth von Moltke =

Helmuth von Moltke may refer to:

- Helmuth von Moltke the Elder (1800–1891), German military officer
- Helmuth von Moltke the Younger (1848–1916), German military officer
- Helmuth James Graf von Moltke (1907–1945), German jurist
