= Ehingen =

- Town
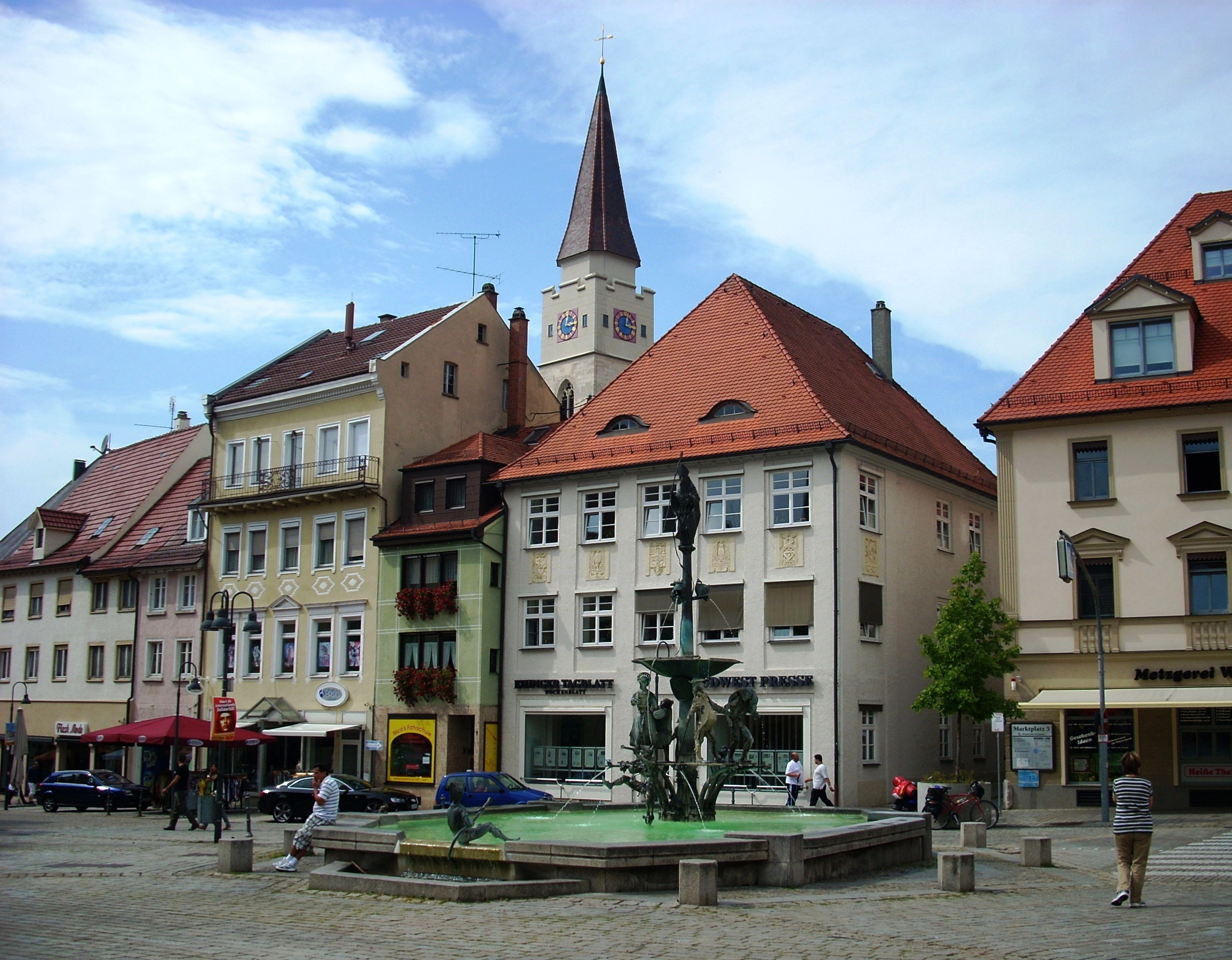
- Market square

- Coat of arms

- Location of Ehingen within Alb-Donau-Kreis district
- Interactive map of Ehingen
- Location within Germany Location within Baden-Württemberg
- Coordinates: 48°17′0″N 9°43′25″E
- Country: Germany
- State: Baden-Württemberg
- Admin. region: Tübingen
- District: Alb-Donau-Kreis
- Subdivisions: 18

Government
  - Mayor (2018–26): Alexander Baumann (CDU)

Area
  - Total: 178.33 km^{2} (68.85 sq mi)
- Elevation: 515 m (1,690 ft)

Population (2025-12-31)
  - Total: 27,700
  - Density: 155/km^{2} (402/sq mi)
- Time zone: UTC+01:00 (CET)
  - Summer (DST): UTC+02:00 (CEST)
- Postal codes: 89584
- Dialling codes: 07391
- Vehicle registration: UL
- Website: www.ehingen.de

Ehingen (Donau) (German pronunciation: [ˈeː(h)ɪŋən]; Swabian: Eegne) is a town in the Alb-Donau district in Baden-Württemberg, Germany, situated on the left bank of the Danube, approx. 25 kilometres (16 miles) southwest of Ulm and 67 km (42 mi) southeast of Stuttgart.

The city, like the entire district of Ehingen, belonged to the French occupation zone from 1945 and initially became part of the post-war state of Württemberg-Hohenzollern and from 1952 of the administrative region of South Württemberg-Hohenzollern in the new state of Baden-Württemberg.

== Statistics ==
Ehingen is situated at 48°17'N and 9°43'E at 515 meters above sea level (town hall). The municipality has a size of 178.51 square kilometres (68.92 square miles).

In contrast to many other towns in Germany, Ehingen's number of inhabitants has constantly been growing during the last years. In 2006 it peaked at 26,054. However, according to forecasts, no major changes are expected anymore until 2025. This development against the trend probably has its roots in a favorable economic situation.

While many other cities and towns struggle with the problem of a quickly ageing society, Ehingen has managed to keep the average age of its inhabitants below the Baden-Württemberg average, which is the lowest among all German Länder. In 2006 the average was 39.9 years of age, until 2025 it will rise to 45.3 according to forecasts, which still will be lower than the average age in Baden-Württemberg.

== Geographical location ==
Ehingen is located on the southern edge of the middle Swabian Jura on the north bank of the Danube. The Danube clips the city only in the extreme southeast. The district Rißtissen is as exclave around eight kilometers east of the center in the Danube plain on the crack.

== Neighboring communities ==
The following cities and towns (they belong, unless otherwise indicated, to the Alb-Donau-Kreis) adjoin the town of Ehingen, starting from the north in clockwise order: Schelklingen, Allmendingen, Altheim (Ehingen), Öpfingen and Griesingen, Laupheim and Schemmerhofen (both Biberach district) Unterstadion, Rottenacker, Munderkingen, Untermarchtal, Lauterach, Hayingen and Münsingen (both Reutlingen district).

== Constituent ==
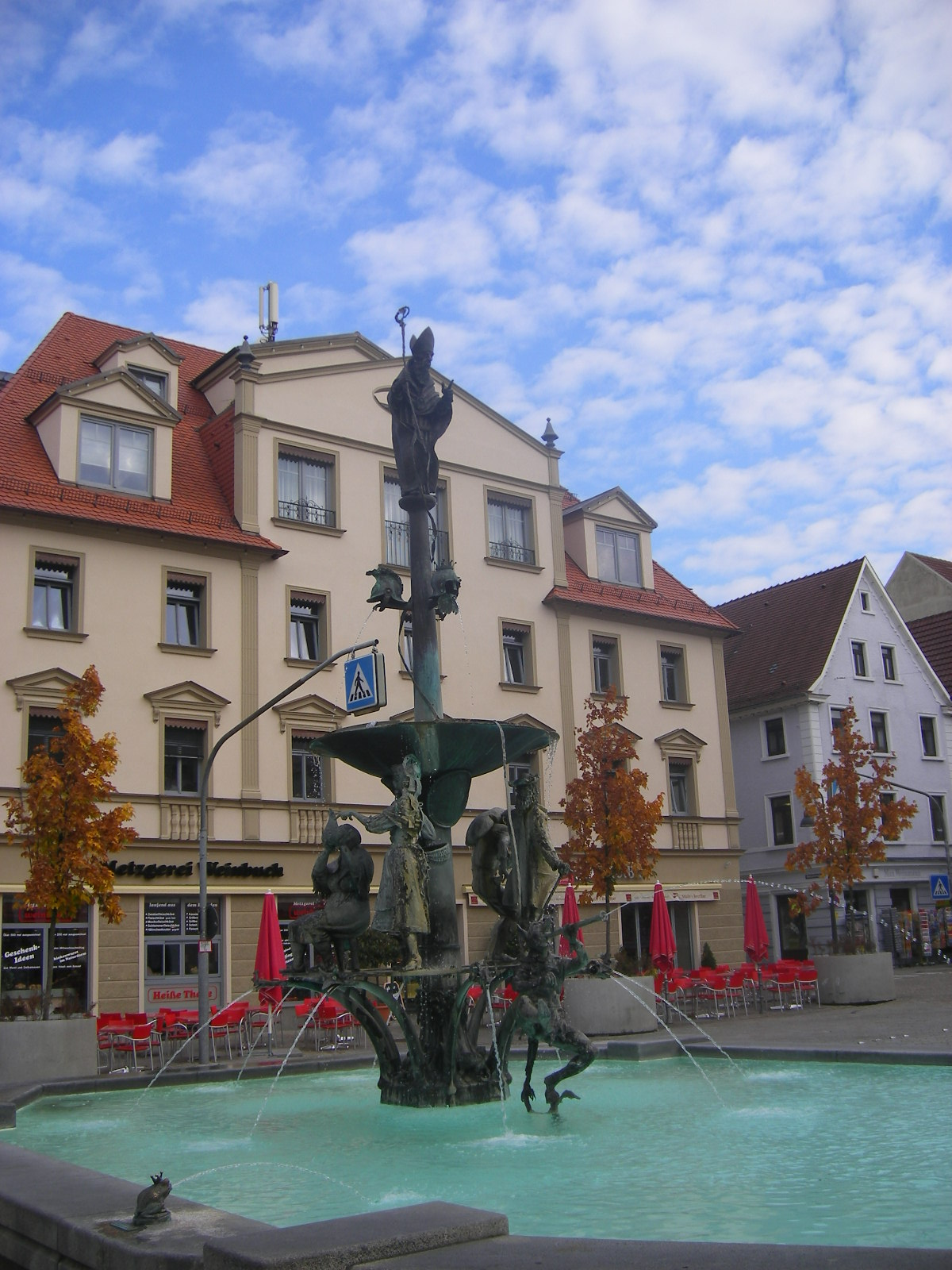
Market square

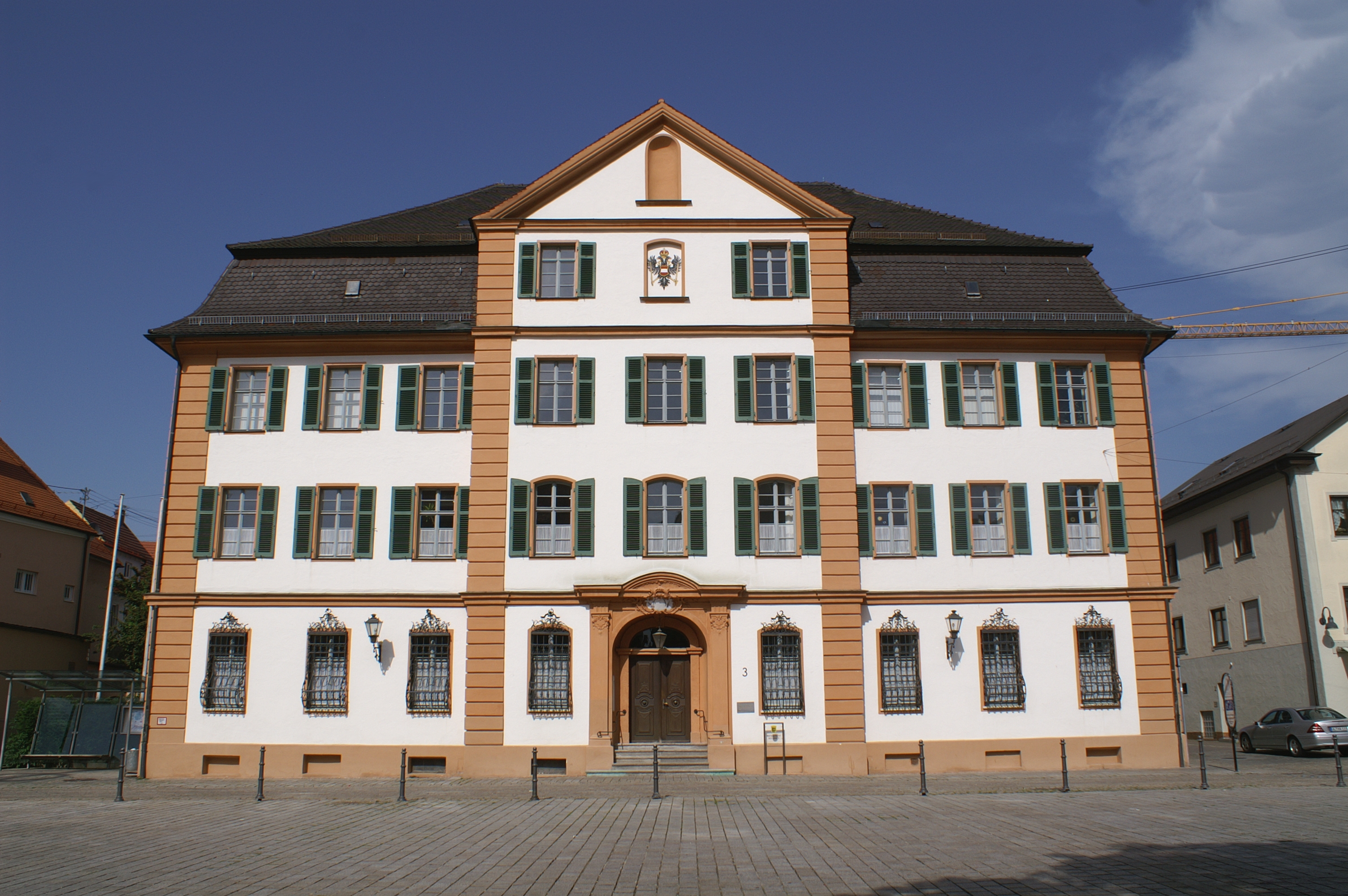
Ehingen (Donau) Ständehaus

The town consists of the core city, which includes municipalities Dettingen and Berkach (incorporated in 1939), and the municipalities Altbierlingen, Altsteußlingen, Berg, Dächingen, Erbstetten, Frankenhofen, Gamerschwang, Granheim, Herbertshofen, Heufelden, Kirchbierlingen, Kirchen, Mundingen, Nasgenstadt, Rißtissen, Schaiblishausen and Volkersheim (incorporated in the framework of local government reform in the 1970s). The former municipalities are also places in the sense of Baden-Württemberg municipal code, that is, they each have one of the voters at each municipal election to be elected Ortschaftsrat with a mayor as chairman. In every town there is a village administrative, quasi a "local city", whose leader is the mayor. Some districts still include spatially separate living spaces with their own name, but usually have few inhabitants, or residential areas with their own brand names have emerged in the course of development and whose boundaries are then usually not well-defined. Such dwelling places are:

- in the core city: Jägerhof, Käshof, Saurücken, Steinhoflehen and Ziegelhof
- in Berg: Ernsthof
- in Erbstetten: Vogelhof
- in Frankenhofen: Karlshof.

== History ==
"Eh'gna", the dialect pronunciation of the name Ehingen, has first been mentioned in a written document in 961. The settlement prospered in the 12th and 13th centuries under the reign of the counts of Berg-Schelklingen, Berg nowadays being just the name of a village south of Ehingen. In 1343, the count, Conrad, sold his lands to the Austrian branch of the Habsburgs, who enfeoffed them back to Conrad. Conrad died, without heirs, in 1346; Ehingen therefore became part of Further Austria, eventually being administered as part of the Günzburg district, along with Habsburg parts of the former Burgau. In 1805, the treaties of Pressburg put Ehingen under the rule of the new kingdom of Württemberg. In 1688 and 1749 large parts of the town were destroyed by fire.

== Demographics ==
View chart definition.

== Religion ==
The territory of the city of Ehingen first belonged to the diocese of Konstanz. As a result of it belonging to Austria, the Reformation was not introduced, so that the city remained predominantly Catholic for many centuries. Only in the district Mundingen, the Reformation was introduced in 1535, because it belonged to Württemberg. The first Ehingen church was mentioned in 1182; in 1339, it appeared as a church consecrated to St. Blasius.

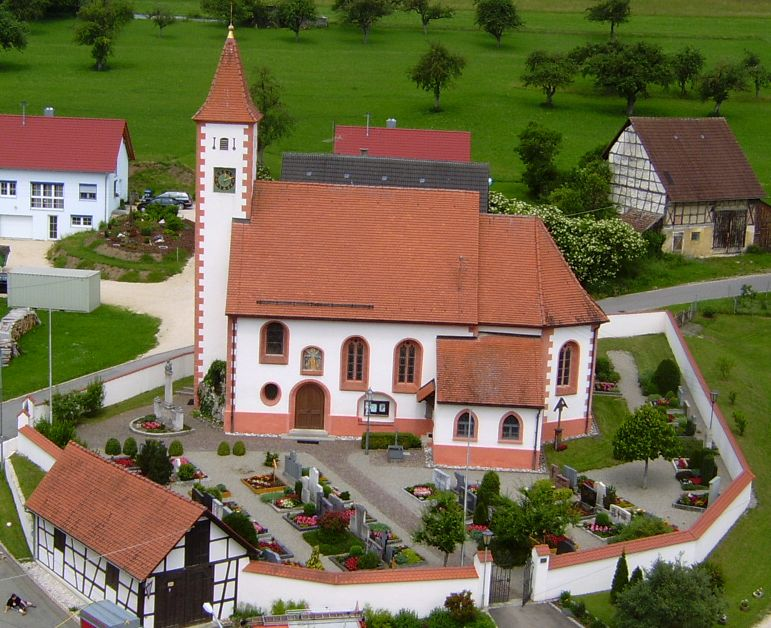
Erbstetten St.-Stefanus-Kirche

Today's St. Blasius church is a building from the 18th century with a tower from 1888. Another Catholic church is the Herz-Jesu-Kirche (Konviktskirche) from 1712/19 with a tower from 1885. The Catholics of the core city and Altsteußlingen, Berkach, Dettingen and Herbertshofen belong to the two parishes of St. Blasius and St. Michael. Altsteußlingen has a church from 1756 with a Gothic choir and a new tower from 1970. In the accompanying Weiler Blienshofen, there is the Chapel of St. Georg from 1485, which was renewed in the 18th century.

In the other districts of Ehingen, there are the following Catholic parishes: Dächingen, Erbstetten, Frankenhofen, Gamerschwang, Granheim, Kirchbierlingen, Nasgenstadt.

In the early 19th century, all of these Catholic parishes belonged to the rural chapter Ehingen within the Diocese of Konstanz. Since 1821 they belong to the Diocese of Rottenburg, now the Diocese of Rottenburg-Stuttgart. The former deanery Ehingen was consolidated in 2008 with the deanery Ulm to new deanery Ehingen-Ulm based in Ulm.

In the 19th century and again members of the Evangelical Church moved to Ehingen, later also in the other today Catholic neighborhoods Ehingen. At first they were supervised by the parish Rottenacker. 1848 branch church was in Ehingen decorated and built in 1879 a Protestant church. Since 1889, there is a separate parish. The community center Wenzelstein own parish was created in 1971. Today, the Protestant parish Ehingen comprises the two parish districts Ehingen-Nord and Ehingen-Süd, forming the total parish Ehingen (Gesamtkirchengemeinde) together with Allmendingen. It belongs to the church district Blaubeuren within the Evangelical-Lutheran Church in Württemberg.

Mundingen has its own Protestant church community that has existed since the Reformation, because this place then already belonged to Württemberg. The local parish church was rebuilt in 1790.

== Transportation ==
Train transportation is served by the Ulm–Sigmaringen railway.

== Twin towns – sister cities ==
Ehingen is twinned with:

- Esztergom, Hungary

== Notable people ==
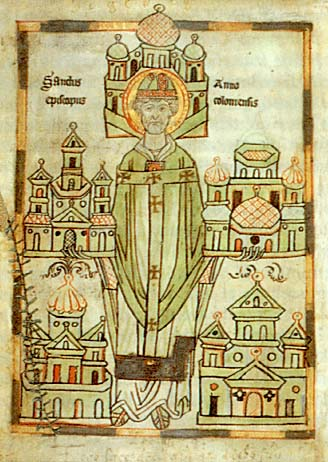
Anno II, c. 1180

- Anno of Cologne (1010–1075), Archbishop of Cologne and regent of the Holy Roman Empire.
- Jacob Bidermann (1578–1639), a Jesuit priest and professor of theology, remembered for his plays.
- Franz Schenk Freiherr von Stauffenberg (1878–1950), nobleman, businessman and politician
- Rita von Gaudecker (1879–1968), author of books for children and young people, died locally
- Karl Rapp (1882–1962), founder and owner of the Munich Rapp Motorenwerke
- Anton Schlecker (born 1944), entrepreneur, founder of Schlecker drug stores
- Manuel Hagel (born 1988), German politician (CDU)

=== Sport ===
- Michael Glöckner (born 1969), track cyclist, gold medallist at the 1992 Summer Olympics
- Zoltan Sebescen (born 1975), former footballer, played 144 games and one for Germany
- Thomas Geyer (born 1991), footballer who has played over 440 games
- Ecem Cumert (born 1998), a Turkish footballer, who has played over 90 games and 21 for Turkey women
- Jonas Ried (born 2004), racing driver
- Lenny Ried (born 2007), racing driver
