= Krzysztof Wilmanski =

Polish-German scientist

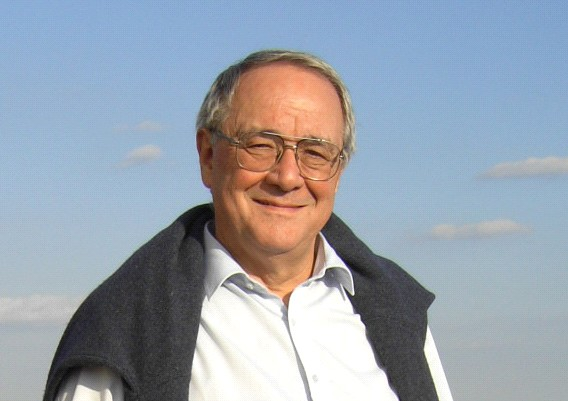
- Born: March 1, 1940; Łódź, Poland
- Died: August 26, 2012 (aged 72); Berlin, Germany
- Education: Technical University of Łódź
- Awards: M. T. Huber Prize, Lady Davis Prize
- Scientific career
- Fields: Continuum mechanics

Krzysztof Wilmanski (March 1, 1940 – August 26, 2012) was a Polish-German scientist working in the fields of continuum mechanics and thermodynamics.

== Main research fields ==
- axiomatic and kinetic foundations of continuum thermodynamics,
- mixture theory,
- phase transformations in solids,
- non-newtonian fluids,
- acoustic waves in continua,
- crystal plasticity and the evolution of textures,
- thermodynamics of porous materials.

== Visiting posts ==
- postgraduate at the Johns Hopkins University in Baltimore (USA, 1969–70)
- visiting professor at the University of Baghdad (Iraq, 1972–74)
- von Humboldt stipend (Germany, 1979)
- fellow at Wissenschaftskolleg zu Berlin (Germany, 1984-1985)
- visiting professor at the University of Paderborn (Germany, 1986–87)
- research fellow at the Hamburg University of Technology (Germany, 1987–90)
- the Technische Universität Berlin (Germany, 1991–92)
- the University of Essen (Germany, 1992-1996)
- head of the Research Group Continuum Mechanics in the Weierstrass Institute for Applied Analysis and Stochastics in Berlin (Germany, 1996-2005)
- professor of Mechanics at the University of Zielona Góra (Poland, 2005-2010)
- member of the faculty of the ROSE School, Centre for Post-Graduate Training and Research in Pavia, Italy

== Main original contributions to research ==
- axiomatic foundations of continuum thermodynamics
- thermodynamics of Maxwellian heat conducting fluids
- thermodynamics of poroelastic materials under large deformations
- modelling of porous materials with the balance equation of porosity

(publication list)

== Selected books ==
- Wilmanski, K.: Thermomechanics of Continua, Springer, Berlin, N.Y., 1998, ISBN 978-3540641414.
- Wilmanski, K.: Continuum Thermodynamics, Part I: Foundations, World Scientific, Singapore, 2008, ISBN 978-981-283-556-7.
- Albers, B. (ed.): Continuous Media with Microstructure. Collection in Honor of Krzysztof Wilmanski, Springer, Berlin, Heidelberg, 2010, ISBN 978-3-642-11444-1.
