= Wilhelm Hennis =

German political scientist

Wilhelm Hennis (18 February 1923 – 10 November 2012) was a German political scientist.

Hennis was born in Hildesheim. In 1960, he became professor at the Pedagogical College of Hannover. In 1962, he became a professor in Hamburg, and in 1967 at Albert Ludwigs University of Freiburg, where until his death he was a professor emeritus. He died, aged 89, in Freiburg im Breisgau.
