= Hellmuth =

Hellmuth is both a masculine German given name and a surname. Notable people with the name include:

Given name:

- Hellmuth Heye (1895–1970), German admiral and politician
- Hellmuth Hirth (1886–1938), German engineer who founded engine manufacturing companies
- Hellmuth Karasek (1934–2015), German journalist, literary critic, novelist and author
- Hellmuth Mäder (1908–1984), German general
- Hellmuth von Mücke (1881–1957), German Navy officer, pacifist writer
- Hellmuth Reymann (1892–1988), German Army officer
- Hellmuth Walter (1900–1980), German engineer who pioneered research into rocket engines and gas turbines
- Hellmuth Wolff (organ builder) (1937–2013), Canadian organ builder

Surname:

- Isaac Hellmuth (1819–1901), founder of Huron University College and the University of Western Ontario
- Otto Hellmuth (1896–1968), member of the Nazi party
- George Francis Hellmuth (1907–1999), American architect based in St. Louis, Missouri
- Phil Hellmuth (born 1964), American poker player

== See also ==
- Hellmuth, Obata and Kassabaum, an architecture-engineering firm
- Helmuth
