= Hellmut Geissner =

German scholar of speech and rhetoric (1926–2012)

Hellmut Geissner (March 7, 1926 in Darmstadt, Germany – August 19, 2012 in Lausanne, Switzerland) was a German scholar of speech and rhetoric.

== Biography ==
Geissner began his career at the Johann W. Goethe University in Frankfurt am Main, before teaching at the Saarland University in Saarbrücken. His last appointed position was as full professor at the University of Koblenz-Landau, where he held the chair for "Sprechwissenschaft" (Speech).

After his retirement he continued to teach at various institutions, including the University of Zürich and the University of Vienna. Because of his influence in founding and forming the field, he continues to be considered one of the three most important representatives of the academic study of speech as communication.

Geissner has distinguished himself with numerous publications on speech and its sub-fields, speech training and rhetoric. In addition he developed the five-theorem theory (Fünfsatztheorie) of Argumentation and the situation model of communication.

For many years he held seminars and conducted training sessions for large companies and media concerns, and he is co-founder of the Academic Advisory Committee of the German Society for Speech Communication and Speech Training (Deutsche Gesellschaft für Sprechwissenschaft und Sprecherziehung - DGSS). He also founded the Institute for Rhetoric (IRM) at the European Academy of Otzenhausen (EAO) and, together with Prof. Fred L. Casmir, of the International Colloquium for Communication (ICC).

Geissner has written a "history of speech training ("Geschichte der Sprecherziehung").

Geissner's theory of rhetorical communication is most fully laid out in Rhetorik und politische Bildung ("Rhetoric and Political Education). This theory was the basis of a 13-part television series, Reden und reden lassen ("To Speak and Let Speak"), which won an Adolf Grimme Award, the German equivalent of an Emmy.

Hellmut Geissner lived in Lausanne, Switzerland.

== Honors ==
- Honorary member of the German Society for Speech and Communication Deutschen Gesellschaft für Sprechwissenschaft und Sprecherziehung (DGSS) e. V.
- Honorary Chairman of the Board of Trustees of the Institute for Rhetoric and Methodology (Institut für Rhetorik und Methodik) at the European Academy in Otzenhausen.
- Order of Merit of the Federal Republic of Germany, Service Cross (Bundesverdienstkreuz am Bande)
- Honorary Silver Medal of the Martin-Luther University at Halle-Wittenberg
- Distinguished Recognition by the National Communication Association, für "Outstanding Scholarly and Research Contributions to the Study of International and Intercultural Communication"

== Bibliography ==
As Sole Author:

- "Der Mensch und die Sprache". Studien zur Philosophie von Hans Lipps ("Human Beings and Speech: Studies in the Philosophy of Hans Lipps"), Frankfurt am Main (Dissertation)
- "Schallplattenanalysen. Gesprochene Dichtung" ("Analysis of Poetry Recordings"), Saarbrücken Minerva, 1965
- "Rede in der öffentlichkeit. Eine Einführung in die Rhetorik" ("Public Speaking: An Introduction to Rhetoric"), Stuttgart,1969, Kohlhammer
- "Rhetorik. Studienmaterial" ("Materials for Rhetorical Studies"), Munich 1978, Bayerischer Schulbuch-Verlag, 4th edition, ISBN 3-7627-2110-6
- Rhetorik und politische Bildung (Rhetoric and Political Education)", Frankfurt am Main 1986, Scriptor, 3rd edition, ISBN 3-589-20105-3
- "Sprechwissenschaft. Theorie der mündlichen Kommunikation" ("The Science of Speech: A Theory of Oral Communication"), Frankfurt am Main,1988, Scriptor, 2nd edition ISBN 3-589-20771-X
- "Sprecherziehung. Didaktik und Methodik der mündlichen Kommunikation" ("Speech Training: Pedagogy and Methodology in Oral Communication"), Frankfurt am Main 1986, Scriptor, 2nd edition ISBN 3-589-20788-4
- "mündlich : schriftlich". Sprechwissenschaftliche Analysen freigesprochener und vorgelesener Berichte" ("Written ; Spoken" Rhetorical analysis of freely spoken reports and reports that were read aloud), Frankfurt am Main 1988, Scriptor, ISBN 3-589-20837-6
- "Vor Lautsprecher und Mattscheibe. Medienkritische Arbeiten 1965-1990" ("From out of Speakers and Screens: Media Criticism, 1965-1990"). Sankt Ingbert 1991, Verlag Röhrig, ISBN 3-924555-74-5
- "Wege und Irrwege der Sprecherziehung. Personen, die vor 1945 im Fach anfingen und was sie schrieben" ("Paths and Misdirections in Speech Training: People Who Began Their Careers before 1945 and What They Wrote"), St. Ingbert 1997, ISBN 3-86110-116-5
- Kommunikationspädagogik. Transformationen der „Sprech"-Erziehung ("Communication Pedagogy: The Transformation of 'Speech' Training"), St. Ingbert 2000, Verlag Röhrig, ISBN 3-86110-244-7
- Demokratie und rhetorische Kommunikation. Ausgewählte Aufsätze ("Democracy and Rhetorical Communication: Selected Essays"), St. Ingbert 2005, Röhrig Universitätsverlag, ISBN 3-86110-395-8

As Co-author:

- "Grundlagen der Schauspielkunst" ("Basics of the Actor's Art"), Velber bei Hannover 1965, Friedrich Verlag
- "Reden und reden lassen", Begleitmaterial zur gleichnamigen Fernsehreihe (SWF) ("To Speak and Let Speak," Companion material for the television series in Southwest German Television") Stuttgart 1975, Deutsche Verlags-Anstalt, ISBN 3-421-06440-7
- "Zeichen im Gottesdienst" ("Signs in Religious Services"), Munich 1976, Kaiser Verlag/Kösel Verlag, ISBN 3-459-01084-3
- "Gesprächsführung/Führungsgespräche" ("Conversations Between Managers and Employees"), St. Ingbert 5. Auflage 2008, Röhrig Universitätsverlag 978-3-86110-168-0

A comprehensive, thematically organized bibliography (1954–2007) appears in: E. Slembek, "Transzensionen: angeregt - weiterdenken. Ehrencolloquium zum 80. Geburtstag von Hellmut K. Geißner, St. Ingbert 2007, Röhrig Universitätsverlag, ISBN 978-3-86110-427-8, S. 135-173
