= Rapp Rp III =

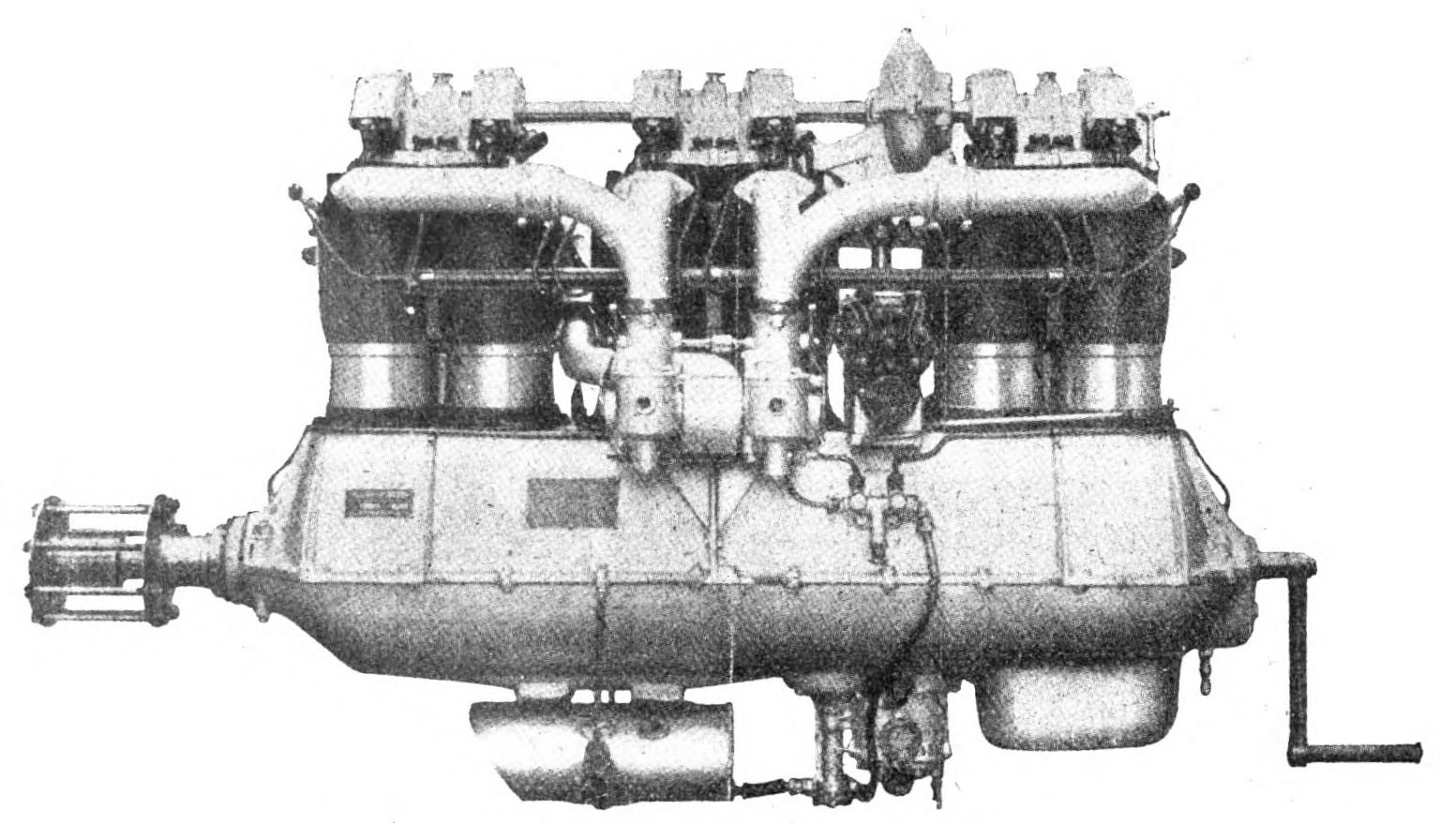
- Rapp Rp III aircraft engine, intake side
- Type: Inline piston engine
- National origin: Germany
- Manufacturer: Rapp Motorenwerke
- First run: c. 1914
- Major applications: Lohner L
- Developed from: Rapp 100 hp

The Rapp Rp III was a six-cylinder, SOHC valvetrain water-cooled inline aircraft engine built by Rapp Motorenwerke. Its design had been based on the previous Rapp 100 hp four-cylinder engine.

== Design and development ==
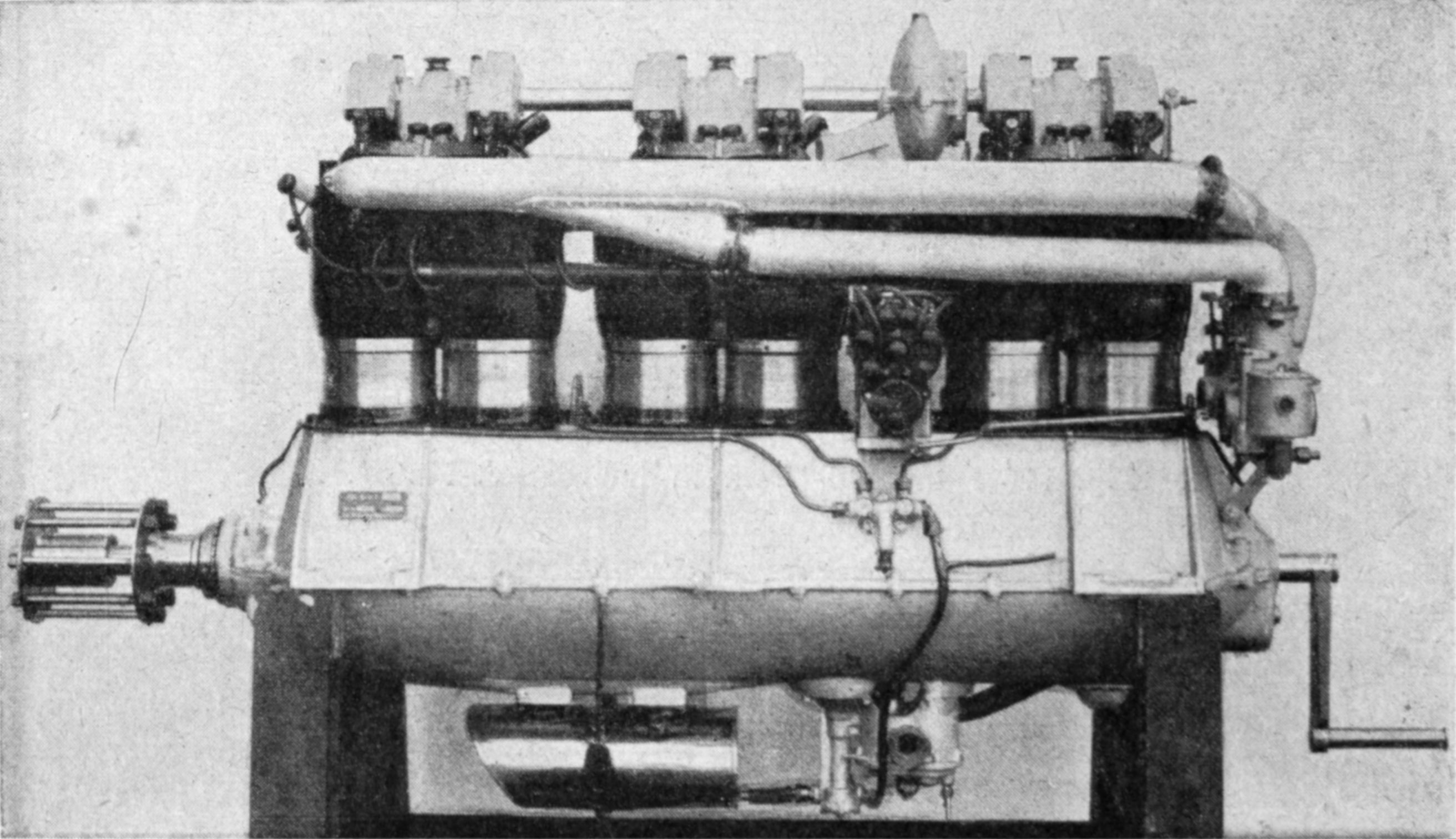
First model of the Rapp 150 hp six-cylinder engine, intake side view, showing the carburettors on the rear end of the engine

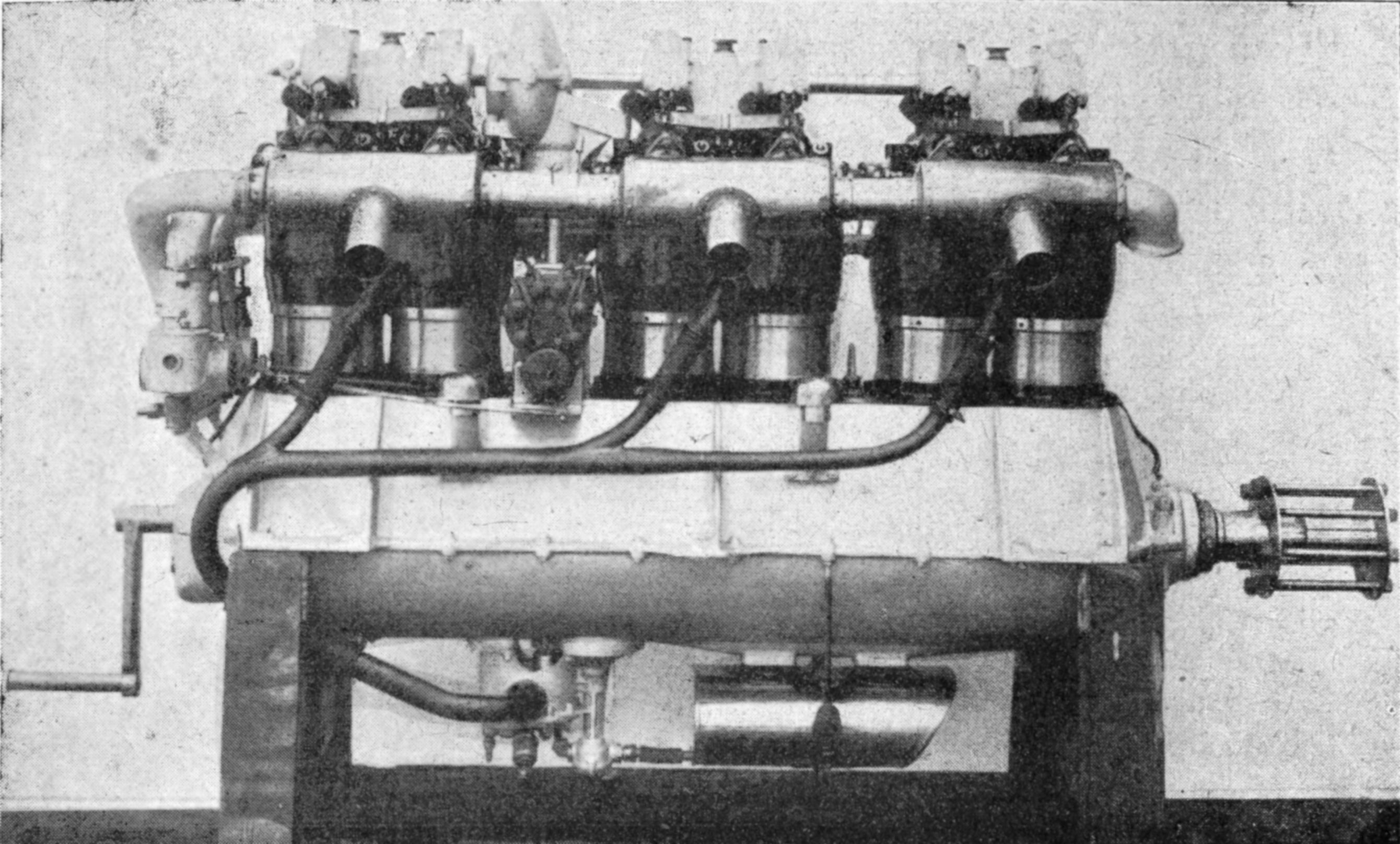
First model of the Rapp 150 hp six-cylinder engine, exhaust side view, intake of pre-heated air routed through the exhaust pipes

When the Rapp Motorenwerke were founded on 27 October 1913 Karl Rapp immediately concentrated on designing new aircraft engines. Besides the Rapp 100 hp four-cylinder, an improved version of FD 1416 engine he had designed previously at Flugwerk Deutschland, he also worked on a 125 hp (93 kW) six-cylinder aircraft engine for the second Kaiserpreis contest for aviation engines. This 125 hp engine however was not completed on time for the Kaiserpreis and further development led to the 150 hp Rapp six-cylinder engine in 1914. The early 150 hp version of this engine was said to have developed roughly around 150 hp (112 kW) up to 160 hp (119 kW) at 1,300–1,400 rpm and weighing about 260–265 kg (573–584 lb), while the later versions were said to have developed about 170-175 hp and weighing around 290 kg.

=== The 150 hp Rapp Rp III ===
The engine had its cylinders arranged in pairs, with two separate steel cylinder liners screwed into the pairwise cast cylinder heads. The cylinder heads had integral cooling jackets and were cast from steel in pairs and then machined. The valve seats, with the exhaust valve seats being water-cooled, were separately built parts which were screwed into the cylinder heads and could be easily removed for maintenance work. Both inlet valves of the cylinder pair, and likewise so both exhaust valves on the other side, were pressed into their seat by a single pivoted leaf spring each. The exhaust and inlet valves were actuated successively from a single cam on the overhead camshaft via roller tappets and rocker arms.

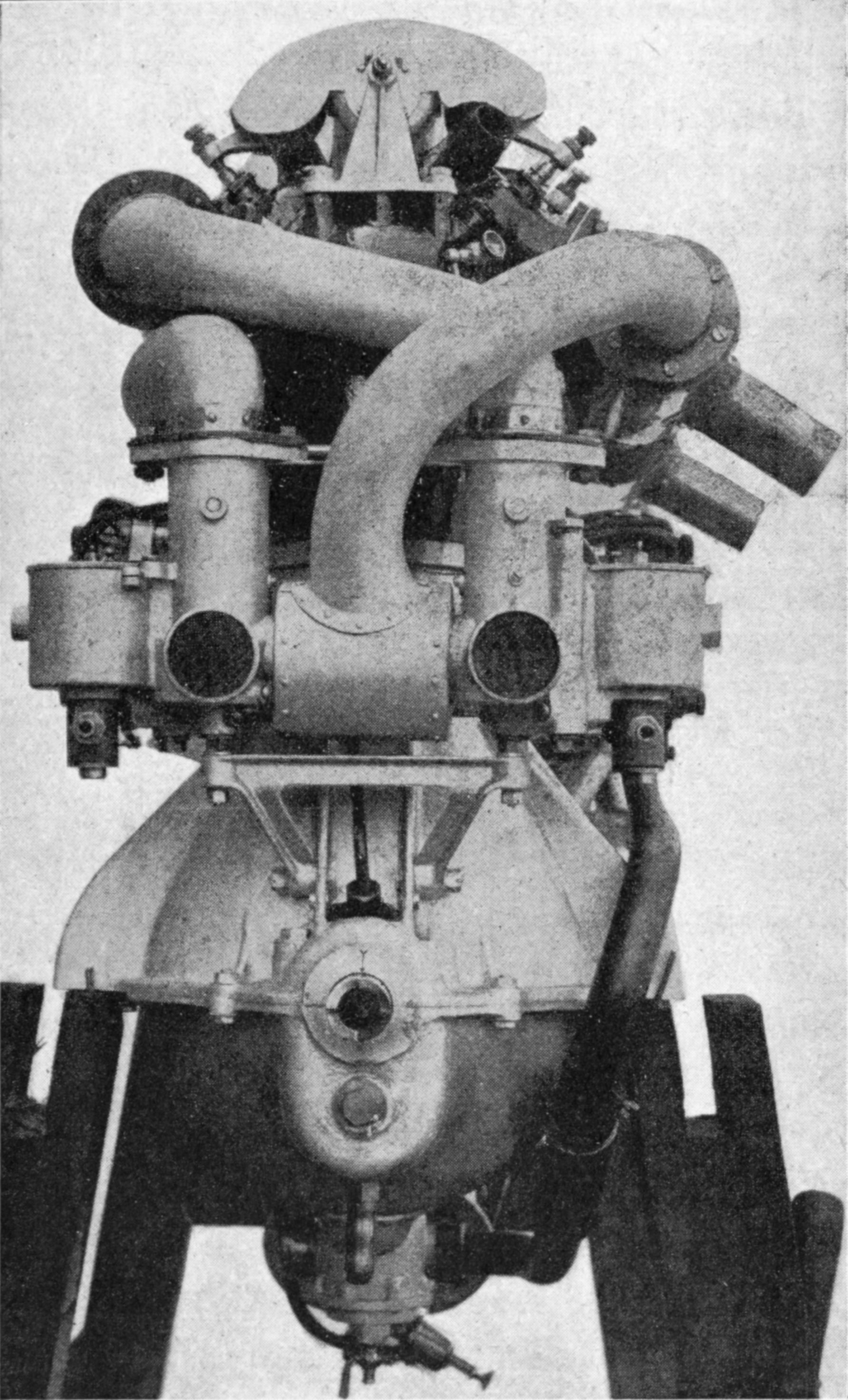
First model of the Rapp 150 hp six-cylinder engine, carburettors on the rear end

The camshaft was driven via a vertical timing shaft and bevel gears between the last two cylinder pairs. Two magnetos provided sparks for the two spark plugs per cylinder and likewise were located between the last two cylinder pairs, also driven from the vertical timing shaft. This arrangement had already been used on Karl Rapp's earlier four-cylinder engine, but contrary to the four-cylinder design, on the six-cylinder engine the additional spacing between the last two cylinder pairs led to an asymmetry in the crankshaft and cylinder arrangement. This asymmetry is believed to have been the major contributor to the severe vibration and longevity problems that the engine had been plagued with.

It appears that this position of the vertical timing shaft had been chosen deliberately in order to keep the pairwise cylinder design while at the same time positioning the magnetos away from the rear end of the engine, complying army administration considerations for avoiding interference on the compass.

The engine case was cast from aluminum in two pieces, parted at the center line in an upper and a lower part. The crankshaft was supported after every two cylinders by the four main journals in the upper part of the crankcase. Lubrication was done by a gear pump which was mounted on the lowest point of the engine. The gear pump fed the oil from a heat permeable cylindrical brass oil reservoir below the engine crankcase to the main journals of the crankshaft, from where it passed on to the rod journals and gudgeon pins through drilled ducts. The proper oil level in the oil reservoir was maintained by an eccentric pump through augmentation of fresh oil and an additional eccentric pump removed excessive oil from the crankcase in case of an inclined engine position. A gear water pump for circulating the engine coolant was also located below the crankcase.

The first engines had two Zenith-type carburettors located at the rear end of the cylinder row, from where they fed the cylinders via two separate pipes, which were conjoined approximately at cylinder three. On later models this arrangement had been given up and the two Zenith carburettors were the relocated to the more conventional position on the left side of the cylinder block, with each of them feeding three cylinders. An in-flight adjustable amount of pre-heated air could be provided to the carburettors via admission pipes routed through the exhaust.

While the Prussian Army Administration rejected the first delivery of these engines as unsuitable, the Bavarian Army Administration and the German Imperial Navy administration continued to order Rapp engines in limited amounts. Also the Austro-Hungarian Armed Forces and especially the Austro-Hungarian Navy administration, being in dire need for engines for their flying boats, ordered Rapp engines. Engine troubles however prevented a greater success of the engine, with the most severe problems being engine roughness and vibrations, frequently damaged bearings and problems with the carburetion.

=== The 175 hp Rapp Rp III ===
In response to a commission for 40 Rapp Rp III engines from the German military authorities, for which the military authorities demanded a power output of at least 175 hp at the acceptance test, Karl Rapp increased the output of his engine accordingly, with further strengthening of the engine resulting in additional weight and increasing vibration problems. It appears that some authors refer to this engine as 175 hp (130 kW) Rapp Rp IIIa, while others still refer to it as Rapp Rp III.

The acceptance test in January 1916 turned out to be a failure, with the engines crankshaft breaking after several test runs with a total duration of 32 hours. As a result, also the Bavarian Army Administration a well as the Austrian Army Administration withdrew from ordering further Rapp engines, with the Austro-Hungarian Navy administration remaining the only customer.

== Variants ==
150 hp Rapp Rp III six-cylinder
1914, 150 hp (112 kW), 1,350 rpm, 140 mm × 160 mm (5.5 in × 6.3 in) bore and stroke
175 hp Rapp Rp III (resp. Rp IIIa) six-cylinder
1916, 175 hp (130 kW), 1,400 rpm, 140 mm × 160 mm (5.5 in × 6.3 in) bore and stroke

== Applications ==
- Albatros C.I, operated by the German Imperial Navy (150 hp Rapp Rp III)
- Lohner Type Warnemünde (150 hp Rapp)
- Lohner Type L (150 hp Rapp)
- Lohner Type T (150 hp Rapp)
- Lohner Type Te (150 hp Rapp)
- Lohner Type Tl (150 hp Rapp)
- Albatros Type Weichmann (150 hp Rapp)
- UFAG Type Weichmann (150 hp Rapp)
- UFAG Type Brandenburg (175 hp Rapp)
- DFW Pfeil Doppeldecker "Renn-Militär-Doppeldecker 1914" (150 hp Rapp six-cylinder)
- Otto C.I (Rapp six-cylinder)
- Otto Rumpf-Doppeldecker 1914 (150 hp Rapp six-cylinder)
- Rumpler C.I (training aircraft, 175 hp Rapp Rp IIIa)

== Specifications (Rapp Rp III 175 hp) ==
Data from Huth

=== General characteristics ===
- Type: six-cylinder, water-cooled in-line piston engine
- Bore: 140 mm (5.51 in)
- Stroke: 160 mm (6.30 in)
- Displacement: 14.78 L (902 cu in)
- Designer: Karl Rapp

=== Components ===
- Valvetrain: two single overhead camshaft-actuated valves per cylinder
- Cooling system: Water-cooled
- Reduction gear: Direct-drive

=== Performance ===
- Power output: 174 hp (130 kW) at 1,382 rpm
- Compression ratio: 4.65

== See also ==
Related development

- Rapp 100 hp

Related lists

- List of aircraft engines
