= Rapp 100 hp =

- Type: Inline piston engine
- National origin: Germany
- Manufacturer: Rapp Motorenwerke
- First run: c. 1913
- Developed into: Rapp Rp III

The Rapp 100 hp was a four-cylinder, SOHC valvetrain liquid-cooled inline aircraft engine built by Rapp Motorenwerke. The engine originated from Karl Rapp's earlier 90 hp four-cylinder that he had designed at the Flugwerk Deutschland GmbH for the 1912/13 Kaiserpreis aircraft engine contest.

== Design and development ==
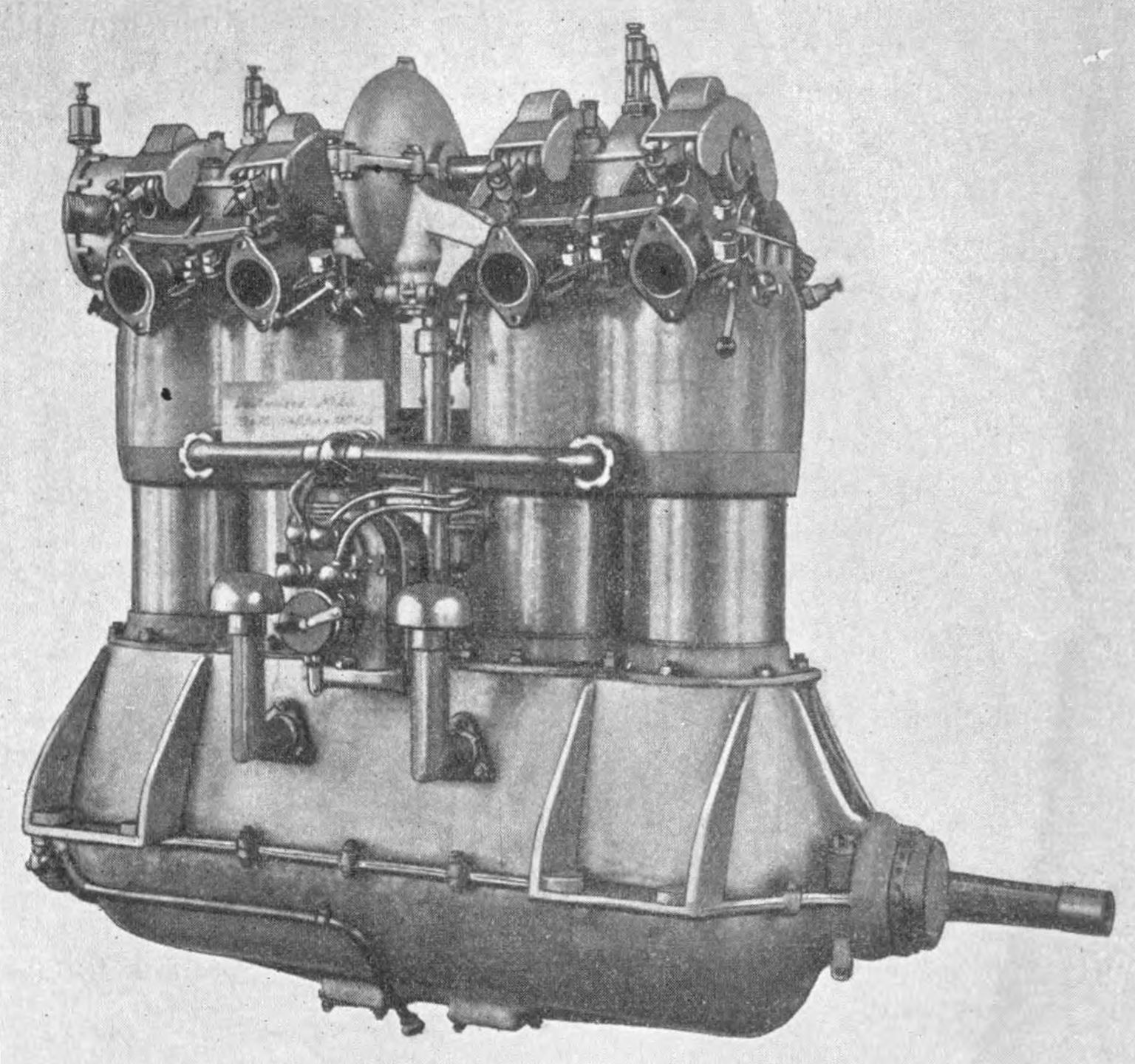
Flugwerk Deutschland engine of 1912, from which the Rapp 100 hp was derived.

Karl Rapp had already designed a 90 hp four-cylinder single overhead camshaft engine with a bore and stroke of 140 mm × 160 mm (5.5 in × 6.3 in) at the Munich branch of the Flugwerk Deutschland GmbH for first Kaiserpreis contest in 1912. This four-cylinder engine however did not perform well in the tests at the contest and was considered too heavy and had a high fuel consumption. Due to lack of success of the aircraft and engine designs produced by Flugwerk Deutschland, the company, where Karl Rapp held a leading position, had to be liquidated in summer 1913.

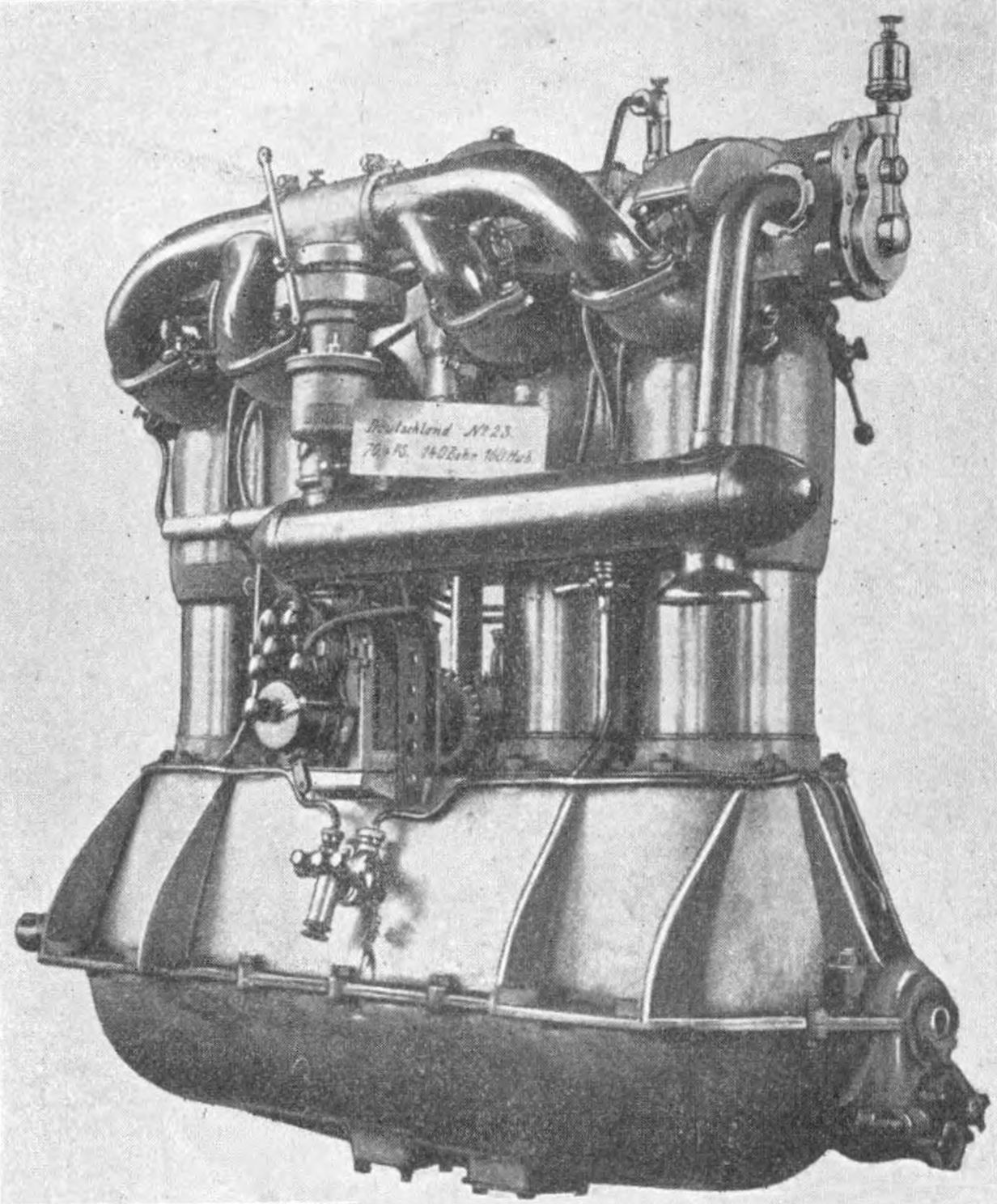
Flugwerk Deutschland engine, 1912, intake side with Cudell-G.A.-carburettor.

After a failed attempt to establish a new aircraft and aircraft engine manufacturing company from the remains of the defunct Flugwerk Deutschland, Karl Rapp finally founded together with Julius Auspitzer the Rapp Motorenwerke GmbH on 27 October 1913 with the corporate purpose of "manufacture and sales of engines of all types, in particular internal combustion engines for aircraft and motor vehicles". The newly founded Rapp Motorenwerke had acquired all production facilities of the former Flugwerk Deutschland branch in Munich-Milbertshofen, also including all the aircraft engines. This enabled Rapp to submit an offer for the immediate delivery of 100 hp four cylinder engines to the Prussian Army Administration already on 1 November 1913.

The engine had undergone several improvements since the Kaiserpreis contest, but the basic design, particularly that of the cylinders and valvetrain, was kept mostly unchanged. The cylinders were arranged in pairs composed of two separate forged steel cylinder liners screwed into the pairwise cast cylinder heads. The cylinder heads had integral cooling jackets and were cast from steel in pairs and then machined. The valve seats, with the exhaust valve seats being water-cooled, were separately built parts which were screwed into the cylinder heads and could be easily removed for maintenance work. Both inlet valves of the cylinder pair, and likewise so both exhaust valves on the other side, were pressed into their seat by a single pivoted leaf spring.

Each cylinder's exhaust and inlet valves were actuated successively from a single cam lobe on the overhead camshaft via roller tappets and rocker arms. The camshaft was driven via a vertical timing shaft and bevel gears between the two cylinder pairs. Two magnetos provided sparks for the two spark plugs per cylinder and likewise were located between the two cylinder pairs, also driven from the vertical timing shaft.

The crankcase was cast from aluminum in two pieces, parted at the center line in an upper and a lower part. The crankshaft was supported after every two cylinders by the three main journals in the upper part of the crankcase. Lubrication was done by a gear pump which was fitted on the back end of the engine, directly driven by the crankshaft. The gear pump fed the oil from a heat permeable cylindrical brass oil reservoir below the engine crankcase to the main journals of the crankshaft.

One major change of the engine design was the carburetion. The Cudell-G.A.-carburettor on the intake side had been replaced by a Zenith-type carburettor which was mounted on back end of the cylinder block and fed the cylinders via a single pipe. Also preheated air was provided to the carburettors via intake air pipes routed through the exhaust. Also the geared water pump for circulating the engine coolant had been relocated from back end of the camshaft to the back end of the crankshaft.

== Applications ==
- Bomhard-Doppeldecker (1914)
- Gotha LE.2 Taube
- Pfalz-Otto Pusher (Bruno Büchner's aircraft in German South West Africa)

== Specifications ==
=== General characteristics ===
- Type: four-cylinder, water-cooled in-line piston engine
- Bore: 140 mm (5.51 in)
- Stroke: 160 mm (6.30 in)
- Displacement: 9.85 L (601 cu in)
- Designer: Karl Rapp

=== Components ===
- Valvetrain: two single overhead camshaft-actuated valves per cylinder
- Cooling system: Water-cooled
- Reduction gear: Direct-drive

=== Performance ===
- Power output: 100 hp (75 kW)

== See also ==
Related development

- Rapp Rp III
- Rapp 125/145 hp
- Rapp 200 hp

Related lists

- List of aircraft engines
