= Rapp 125/145 hp =

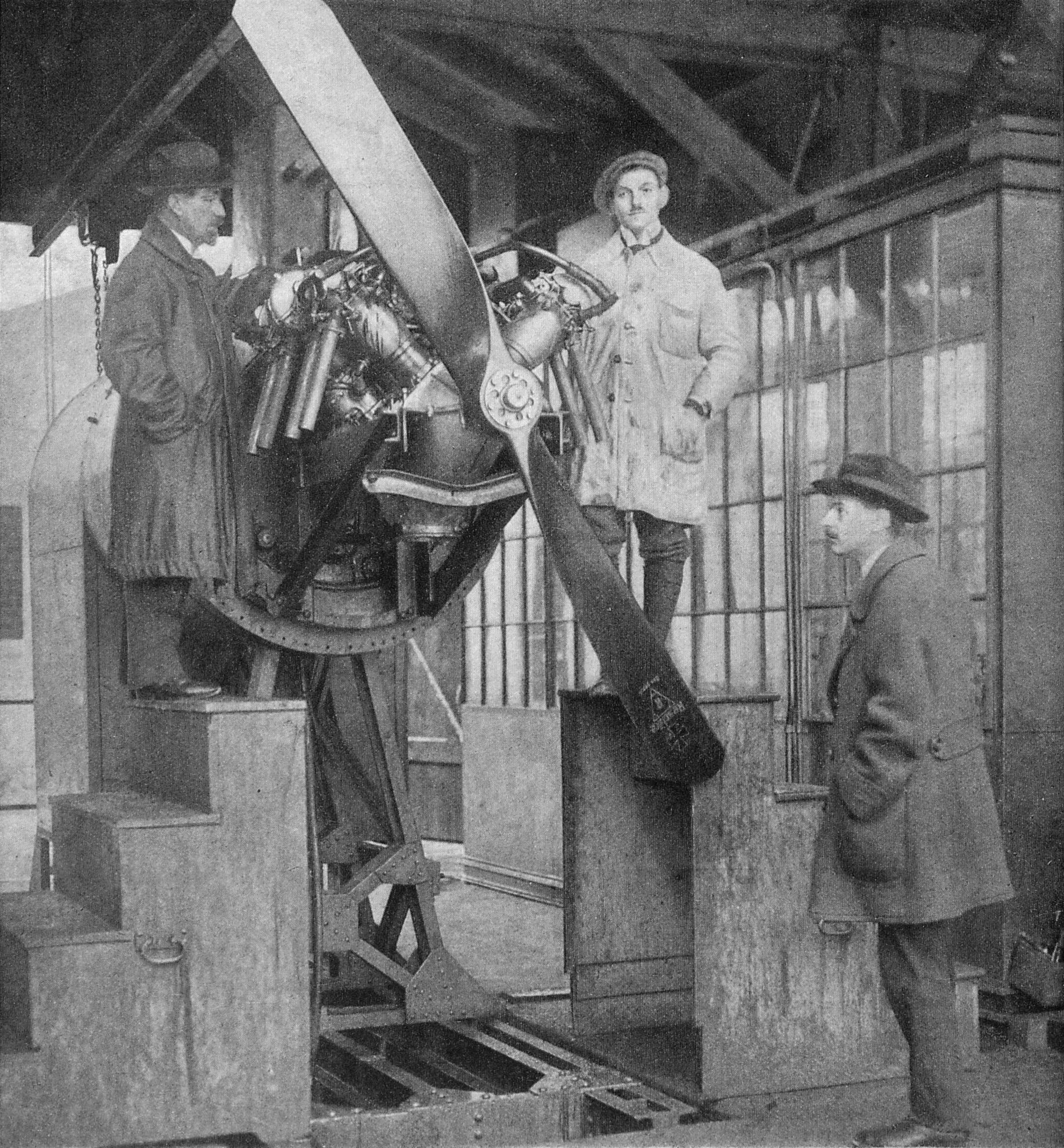
- The 125/145 hp Rapp Rp II eight-cylinder engine on the test bench at the Rapp Motorenwerke
- Type: Inline piston engine
- National origin: Germany
- Manufacturer: Rapp Motorenwerke
- First run: c. 1915
- Major applications: Lohner B.V, Lohner B.VI
- Developed from: Rapp 100 hp

The Rapp 125/145 hp, also referred to as Rapp Rp II, was a water-cooled 90° V-8 aircraft engine built by Rapp Motorenwerke in 1915.

== Design and development ==
The Rapp 125/145 hp V-8 engine design was derived from the earlier four-cylinder Rapp 100 hp design in 1915. It had eight cylinders, arranged in two rows of four, with a reduced bore and stroke of 115 mm × 140 mm (4.53 in × 5.51 in).

An order of 40 engines of this type, destined for the Lohner B.V and B.VI training aircraft, was placed by the Austro-Hungarian Armed Forces around the turn of the year 1915/16. A few engines were also sold to the Bavarian Army, where they were installed on training aircraft, but were plagued with recurrent carburettor fires and soon removed from service.

The design of the cylinders and the valvetrain reflected the design of the Rapp 100 hp four-cylinder. The cylinders of each cylinder row were again arranged in pairs composed of two separate forged steel cylinder liners screwed into the pairwise cast cylinder heads. The cylinder heads had integral cooling jackets and were cast from steel in pairs and then machined. The valve seats, with the exhaust valve seats being water-cooled, were separately built parts which were screwed into the cylinder heads and could be easily removed for maintenance work. Both inlet valves of the cylinder pair, and likewise so both exhaust valves on the other side, were pressed into their seat by a single pivoted leaf spring. The intake was oriented to inner side of the Vee and the exhaust was oriented to the outer side.

Each cylinder's exhaust and inlet valves were actuated successively from a single cam lobe on the overhead camshaft via roller tappets and rocker arms. The camshaft of each cylinder row was driven via a vertical timing shaft and bevel gears between the two cylinder pairs. Two magnetos were also driven from the vertical timing shaft and were located between the two cylinder rows.

The crankcase was cast from aluminum in two pieces, parted at the center line in an upper and a lower part. The lower part had a different design compared to the previous Rapp engines. Instead of a relatively flat base it had a tapered design, with the oil pump installed on the lowest point. The oil was routed via an external oil feeder line to the upper side of the crankcase and then distributed between the two cylinder rows to the main journals. In order to circulate the engine coolant separate geared water pumps were installed on the respective side of the crankcase for each cylinder row.

The engine used two Zenith-type carburettors which were both located between the cylinder rows. Each carburettor fed one row of four cylinders. Also preheated air could be provided to the carburettors via intake air pipes routed through the exhaust.

== Applications ==
- Lohner B.V
- Lohner B.VI
- LVG B.I (Ot) (training aircraft, built by Otto)

== Specifications ==
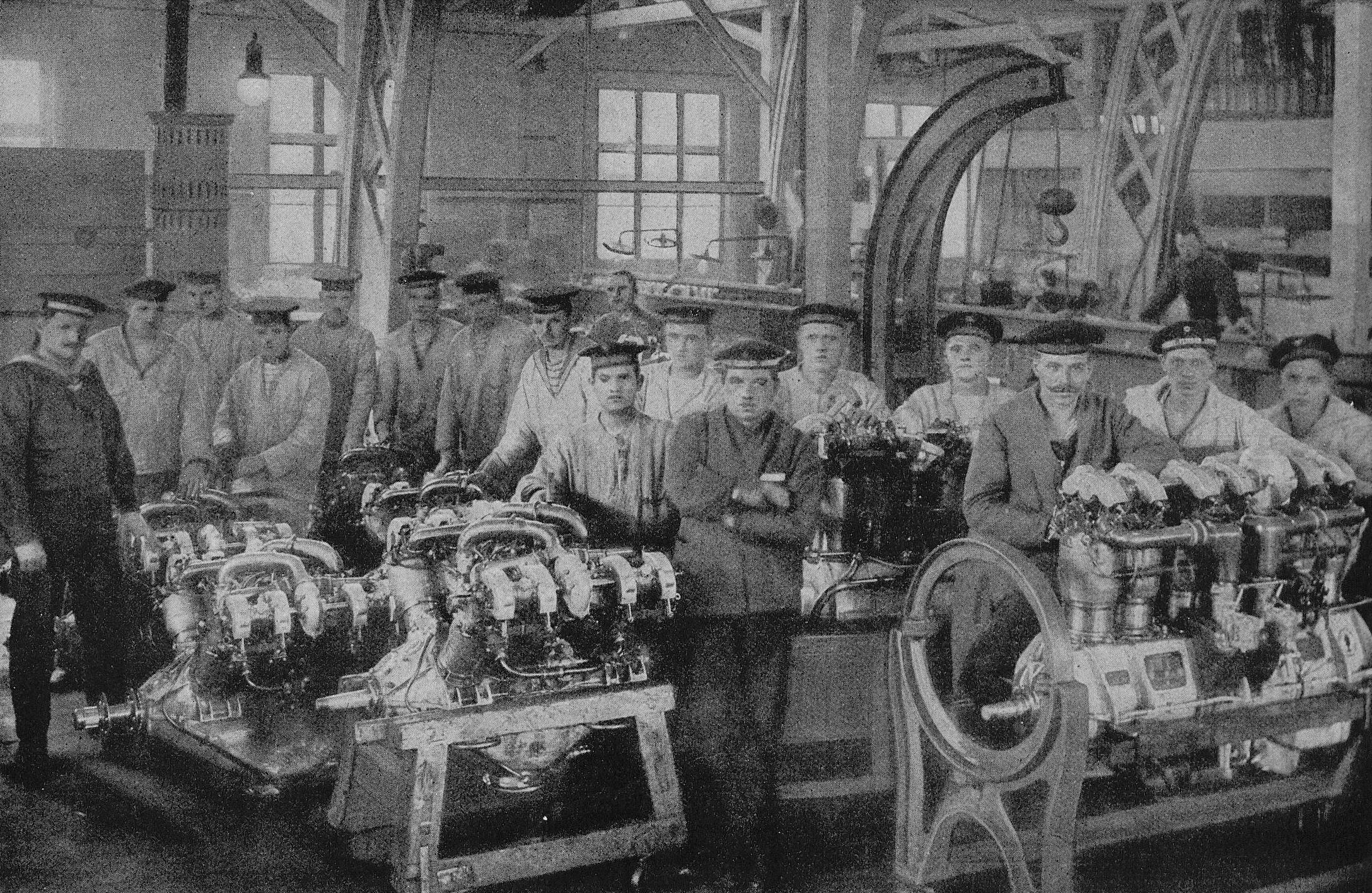
Austrian marines at the Rapp-Motorenwerke, c. 1916. Rapp Rp II engines can be seen on the left.

Data from Eyb

=== General characteristics ===
- Type: eight-cylinder, water-cooled V-8 piston engine
- Bore: 115 mm (4.53 in)
- Stroke: 140 mm (5.51 in)
- Displacement: 11.6 L (708 cu in)
- Dry weight: 220 kg (485 lb)
- Designer: Karl Rapp

=== Components ===
- Valvetrain: two single overhead camshaft-actuated valves per cylinder
- Cooling system: Water-cooled
- Reduction gear: Direct-drive

=== Performance ===
- Power output: 130 hp (97 kW) at 1,400 rpm

== See also ==
Related development

- Rapp 100 hp
- Rapp 200 hp

Related lists

- List of aircraft engines
