= Rapp 200 hp =

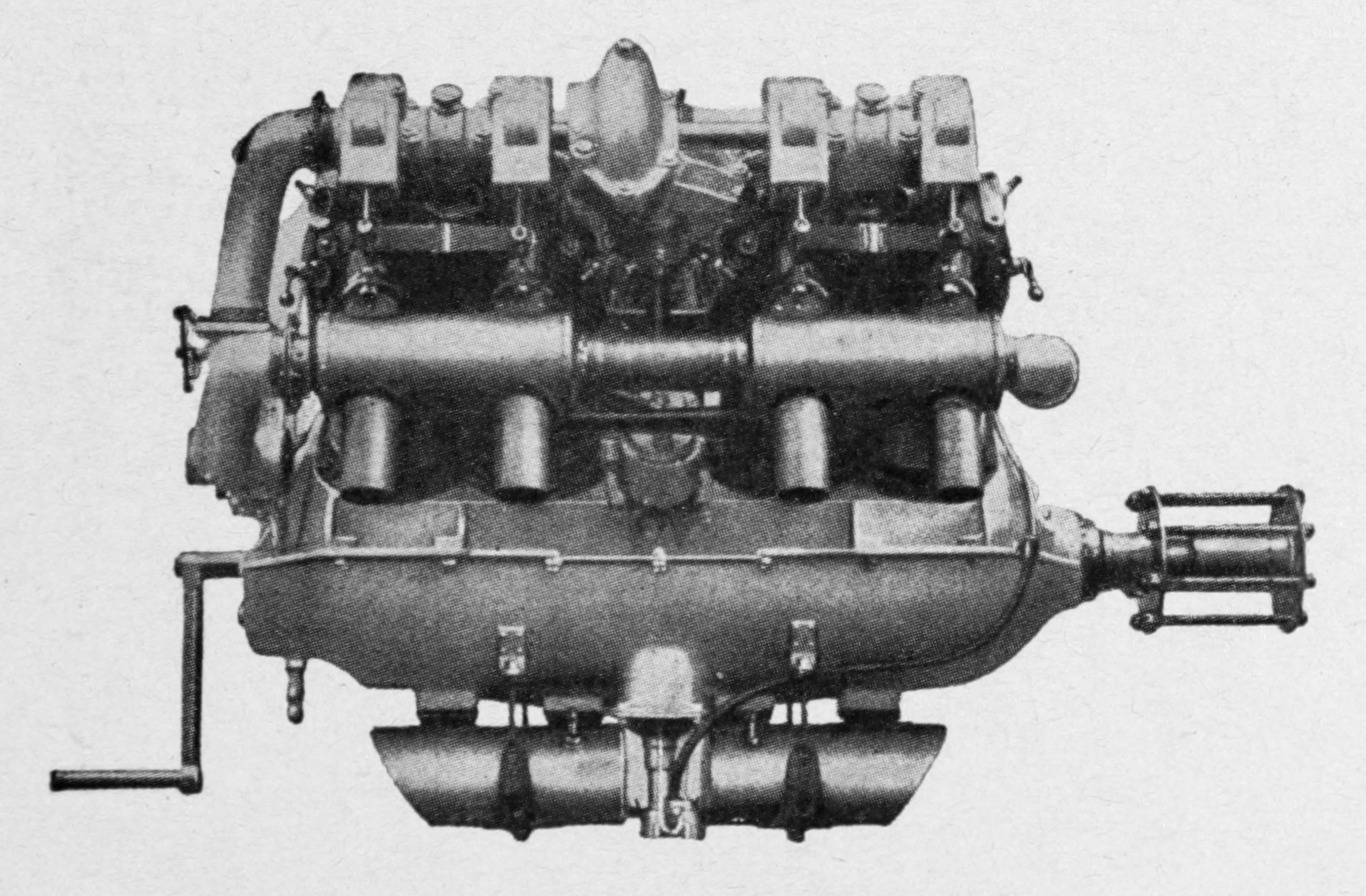
- Rapp 200 hp V-8 aircraft engine, side view
- Type: Inline piston engine
- National origin: Germany
- Manufacturer: Rapp Motorenwerke
- First run: c. 1915
- Developed from: Rapp 100 hp

The Rapp 200 hp was a water-cooled 90° V-8 aircraft engine built by Rapp Motorenwerke.

== Design and development ==
The Rapp 200 hp V-8 engine design was derived from the earlier four-cylinder Rapp 100 hp design approximately around 1915. It had eight cylinders with the same bore and stroke of 140 mm × 160 mm (5.51 in × 6.30 in) as the Rapp 100 hp, arranged in two rows of four. The engine was said to produce about 200–205 hp (149–153 kW) at 1,350 rpm, while weighing about 300–315 kg (661–694 lb).

The design of the cylinders and the valvetrain also reflected the design of the Rapp 100 hp four-cylinder. The cylinders of each cylinder row were again arranged in pairs composed of two separate forged steel cylinder liners screwed into the pairwise cast cylinder heads. The cylinder heads had integral cooling jackets and were cast from steel in pairs and then machined.

The valve seats, with the exhaust valve seats being water-cooled, were separately built parts which were screwed into the cylinder heads and could be easily removed for maintenance work. Both inlet valves of the cylinder pair, and likewise so both exhaust valves on the other side, were pressed into their seat by a single pivoted leaf spring. The intake was oriented to inner side of the Vee and the exhaust was oriented to the outer side.

Each cylinder's exhaust and inlet valves were actuated successively from a single cam lobe on the overhead camshaft via roller tappets and rocker arms. The camshaft of each cylinder row was driven via a vertical timing shaft and bevel gears between the two cylinder pairs. Two magnetos were also driven from the vertical timing shaft and were located between the two cylinder rows.

The crankcase was cast from aluminum in two pieces, parted at the center line in an upper and a lower part. It was designed in the same manner as the Rapp 100 hp four cylinder and the 150 hp Rapp Rp III six-cylinder engines. The crankshaft was supported by the main journals in the upper part of the crankcase. Lubrication was done by a gear pump which was mounted on the lowest point of the engine. The gear pump fed the oil from two cylindrical oil reservoirs, mounted front and aft below the engine crankcase, to the main journals of the crankshaft. In order to circulate the engine coolant separate geared water pumps were installed on the respective side of the crankcase for each cylinder row.

The engine had two Zenith-type carburettors, of which each fed one row of four cylinders separately. It appears that different arrangements for the two carburettors have been tried. Some of the engines had the carburettors located at the back end of the engines, while others had them located between the cylinder rows. Also preheated air could be provided to the carburettors via intake air pipes routed through the exhaust.

=== Rapp 300 hp V-12 ===
The same engine design was also implemented as 60° V-12 engine. The Rapp 300 hp V-12 was said to produce around 300 hp (224 kW) at about 1,350-1,400 rpm, while weighing about 470–474 kg (1,036–1,045 lb). It appears that different variants with outward-facing and inward-facing exhausts have been tried, the latter variant also depicted with Pallas carburettors.

== Variants ==
200 hp Rapp V-8
c. 1915, 200 hp (149 kW), 1,350–1,400 rpm, 140 mm × 160 mm (5.5 in × 6.3 in) bore and stroke
300 hp Rapp V-12
c. 1915, 300 hp (224 kW), 1,350–1,400 rpm, 140 mm × 160 mm (5.5 in × 6.3 in) bore and stroke

== Specifications (200 hp Rapp V-8) ==
Data from Angle

=== General characteristics ===
- Type: eight-cylinder, water-cooled V-8 piston engine
- Bore: 140 mm (5.51 in)
- Stroke: 160 mm (6.30 in)
- Displacement: 19.7 L (1,202 cu in)
- Dry weight: 300 kg (661 lb)
- Designer: Karl Rapp

=== Components ===
- Valvetrain: two single overhead camshaft-actuated valves per cylinder
- Cooling system: Water-cooled
- Reduction gear: Direct-drive

=== Performance ===
- Power output: 200 hp (149 kW) at 1,350 rpm

== See also ==
Related development

- Rapp 100 hp
- Rapp 125/145 hp
- Rapp Rp III

Related lists

- List of aircraft engines
