= Bayerische Flugzeugwerke =

Bayerische Flugzeugwerke may refer to:

- Otto Flugmaschinenfabrik, which became Bayerische Flugzeugwerke in 1916 and then Bayerische Motoren Werke in 1922
- Messerschmitt, which was formed as Bayerische Flugzeugwerke in the 1920s before changing its name to Messerschmitt in 1938
