= Franz Josef Popp =

Co-founder of BMW

- Born: 14 January 1886; Vienna, Austria-Hungary
- Died: 29 July 1954 (aged 68); Stuttgart, West Germany
- Military career
- Allegiance: Austro-Hungarian Empire
- Branch: Imperial Marine Flying Corps
- Service years: 1914–1917
- Commands: Pula, Croatia
- Other work: Entrepreneur; Founder - BMW AG

Franz Josef Popp (14 January 1886 in Vienna – 29 July 1954 in Stuttgart) was one of three men responsible for the founding of BMW AG and the First General Director of BMW AG from 1922 to 1942.

A number of different candidates have been put forward as the “founders” of BMW AG. In the absence of Karl Rapp, Gustav Otto, Max Friz or Camillo Castiglioni the company would probably never have been born. However, Franz Josef Popp can lay claim to being the prime force in the development of the mobility company we know today. He was “General Director” of the company from its foundation until he was forced to relinquish his position in 1942.

== Early years ==
Popp was born in Vienna in 1886 and in 1901 his family moved to Brno where he completed his university entrance qualification at the local grammar school. He went on to study mechanical and electrical engineering at the local Technical College and qualified with a degree in engineering in 1909. When he returned to Vienna, Franz Josef Popp joined the Viennese company AEG-Union as an electrical engineer. He soon became head of the department for “Electric Trains and Locomotives”, and one of his responsibilities was to develop electric locomotives for the Mittenwald railway. At the start of the First World War, Popp joined the Kaiserliche und Konigliche Luftfahrttruppen or "K.u.K. Luftfahrttruppen" (Austro-Hungarian Imperial and Royal Aviation Troops) as a marine engineer at the Pula base on the Adriatic Sea (in present-day Croatia). This is where he had spent his military service as a one-year volunteer during his course of studies. However, three weeks later he was ordered back to Vienna to oversee construction for aircraft engine production, initially at AEG and then at the Austro-Daimler works in Wiener Neustadt. In this capacity, Popp traveled to Germany a number of times to visit the biggest aircraft engine manufacturers in the Reich- Daimler, NAG and Benz. The purpose was to explore opportunities for the production under license of German prototypes at the Austro-Daimler works. Unfortunately, these exploratory talks came to nothing. The Austro-Daimler works went on to develop their own new 12-cylinder aircraft engine for the Austrian navy, although there was not sufficient capacity available for production of this engine. It was necessary to find a production facility that was in a position to manufacture the engine in the quantities required by the military authorities. While he was serving in Pula, Popp had got to know the Rapp Motorenwerke (Rapp Engine Works) in Munich. This company had the necessary skilled workforce and production facilities for manufacturing aircraft engines, but it lacked a competitive product since its engines were not successful as aircraft engines. Given this scenario, Popp regarded the Rapp Engine works as an ideal production facility for manufacturing the 12-cylinder Austro-Daimler engine. He lobbied hard for this solution and was successful in convincing the responsible authorities to take up his suggestion. In 1916, he was dispatched to Munich as the representative of the Austrian Navy to supervise production under license at the Rapp Motorenwerke (Rapp Motor Works). However, Popp was worried about unsatisfactory decisions and targets set by the technical and commercial managers. He became concerned that volumes determined contractually would not be complied with. To ensure compliance with production targets, Popp effectively began to take on the role of factory manager. Popp ensured that Max Friz, a very talented young engineer at Daimler who had recently applied for a position, was hired by Rapp (Friz and Rapp were colleagues together at Austro-Daimler) . Popp understood that Rapp Motorenwerke very much needed a chief engineer with new ideas on making aircraft engines.

== The “General Director” ==
Appointment Certificate naming Popp as General Director of BMW GmbH in 1917

After the success of the BMW IIIa aeromotor, it was decided that Karl Rapp's contract be terminated by the managing board of Rapp Motorenwerke. Popp was appointed as managing director of the company, while at the same time, the name of the company was changed from Rapp Motorenwerke GmbH to Bayerische Motoren Werke GmbH. This was intended to signal a new beginning to the outside world. Following its conversion into a joint-stock company, Popp was head of Bayerische Motoren Werke as chairman of the Board of Management, with the title of General Director.

At the end of the First World War, Popp was responsible for switching the young company from aircraft engine production to peacetime production. With this aim in mind, he worked towards creating a link with Knorr-Bremse AG, and from 1919 onwards, the factory started manufacturing Knorr brakes for the Bavarian Railway.

In 1922, Popp was responsible for transferring the most important patents, machinery and personnel for engine manufacture “to the umbrella of the Bayerische Flugzeugwerke AG” (formerly Otto Flugmaschinenfabrik), together with the company name Bayerische Motoren Werke AG. He was assisted in this endeavor by the Austrian financier Camillo Castiglioni. In this way, he was able to break free from Knorr-Bremse AG and start up engine construction once more.

== New areas of business ==
The rise of BMW to one of Bavaria’s and Germany’s big industrial companies began in 1922 under Popp’s management. The product range of BMW AG was expanded and soon it extended beyond engines for the aircraft industry to include motorcycles as broader sections of the population gained access to motorized transport. This was an area to which Popp devoted considerable attention. Under his chairmanship, BMW AG further expanded its product range and know-how in 1928 by purchasing the vehicle manufacturing factory Fahrzeugfabrik Eisenach (FFE). This was the first time that cars bore the BMW brand on the roads. In 1928, Popp also concluded a license agreement with the US American company Pratt & Whitney, allowing BMW to manufacture two air-cooled radial engines. This ensured that BMW had access to key know-how in an area of aircraft engine construction with a great future. The expertise acquired through production under license allowed BMW to develop air-cooled radial engines under its own steam during the 1930s. Construction of the BMW aircraft engine factory in Allach (1935), expansion of the manufacturing facilities in Eisenach (1937) and acquisition of the Brandenburg Motor Works (Bramo) in Berlin-Spandau enabled BMW to expand capacities for aircraft engine manufacture under Popp’s leadership. Following the acquisition of Bramo in 1939, BMW enjoyed a monopoly for the production of air-cooled aircraft engines in Germany. This made BMW a key strategic company for the German aviation industry as the Third Reich rearmed. However, Popp was skeptical of the rapid expansion and redirection of the company for purposes of arming Germany in preparation for war.

== Political meddling ==
These reservations were not politically motivated. Even though Popp admitted that he joined the Nazi Party on 1 May 1933 under pressure from Gauleiter Wagner, head of the Bavarian administrative district, he kept his distance from the party. Looking back, he maintained that joining the party shortly after the National Socialists seized power was simply intended to prevent his removal as General Director of BMW. In February 1936, the local group leader of the National Socialist Party started proceedings to exclude Popp from the party. This was based on accusations that despite warnings, Popp continued to allow his family to be treated by a Jewish family doctor. Following an official “warning” from the Munich Party Court, Popp put the matter to rest, not least to prevent the issue from escalating and endangering his position as Chairman of the Board of Management of BMW AG. Popp’s skepticism against shifting the focus of production at BMW to aircraft engine production was based on his thinking that this would provide a one sided orientation for the group by focusing its activities on armament in preparation for war. Although this area was financially lucrative, it would mean that the group was heavily dependent on decisions made by the National Socialist regime. In June 1940, he wrote to the Chairman of the Supervisory Board, Emil Georg von Stauss, explaining that the situation could “threaten the very existence of BMW AG if there were any setback to aircraft engine production”. The strategically important position of BMW for air armament would lead to a rise in the volume of specifications and more interference from political and military agencies, which would in turn increasingly restrict the scope for entrepreneurial manoeuvre. This would weaken the position of the group’s management. It would also erode the position of Franz Josef Popp, who up until then had directed the company largely autonomously and autocratically.

== Tense climate ==
As the war progressed, the increasing shortage of labor and raw materials combined with the opaque procurement policy of the Reich Air Ministry to ensure that BMW fell well behind the production output requested. This increased the pressure pervading the already tense atmosphere between Popp and the responsible General Aviation Supervisor Erhard Milch in the Air Ministry. Popp’s attempts to gain backing from influential official quarters against Milch’s demands and to obtain realistic production requirements proved counter-productive. The General Aviation Supervisor felt slighted by Popp’s actions and accused him of refusing to perform his duty and of sabotage. Since Popp’s management style had already caused significant tensions in the BMW Board of Management prior to the disputes with the ministry, the Supervisory Board attempted to solve the conflicts by granting Popp leave of absence in January 1942. To prevent public speculation about the management change, Popp was appointed to the Supervisory Board but was no longer able to influence the day-to-day running of the company from this position.

== Unsuccessful comeback ==
Directly after the end of the war, at the age of 59, Popp was again appointed by the Supervisory Board to the Board of Management in May 1945. One month later, the Allies arrested him on account of his title Military Economic Leader, which he had been granted in the course of the war. During the denazification process he was designated as a “nominal member of the Nazi party” and was finally, after an appeal, classified as “untainted”. Franz Josef Popp then once more attempted to join the Board of Management at the Bayerische Motoren Werke. However, his attempts were completely unsuccessful and his move to Stuttgart marked the end of these ambitions. Popp died there on 29 July 1954.

== See also ==
- History of BMW
