= Rapp Motorenwerke =

German aircraft engine manufacturer

Rapp Motorenwerke GmbH
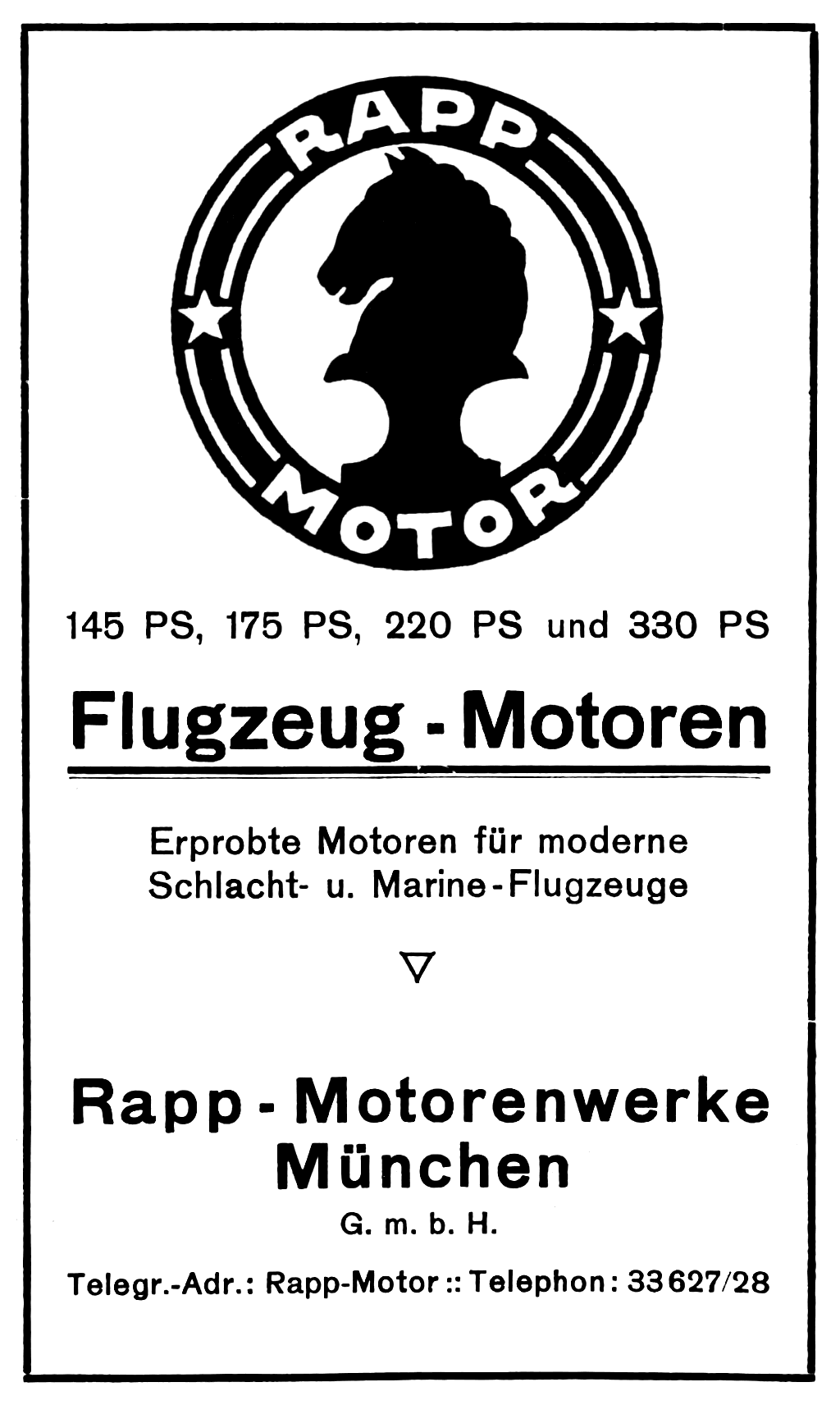
- Rapp logo in a 1916 advertisement
- Company type: GmbH
- Industry: Manufacturing
- Founded: October 27, 1913; 112 years ago
- Founder: Karl Rapp
- Defunct: 1922; 104 years ago
- Fate: Merged into modern BMW
- Successors: Brake manufacturing: Süddeutsche Bremsen-AG; Engine manufacturing: Bayerische Motoren Werke AG
- Headquarters: Munich, German Empire
- Products: Aircraft engines

Rapp Motorenwerke GmbH was a German aircraft engine manufacturer based in Munich, Bavaria. Founded in 1913, the firm changed its name in 1917 to Bayerische Motoren Werke GmbH (BMW). The company later became known as Süddeutsche Bremsen-AG after its engine-production assets and the BMW name were transferred in 1922 to Bayerische Flugzeugwerke (formerly Otto Flugmaschinenfabrik), which was then renamed to Bayerische Motoren Werke AG and subsequently evolved into the automotive manufacturer known today as BMW AG.

== Early engines ==
Karl Rapp and Julius Auspitzer founded Rapp Motorenwerke GmbH on 27 October 1913 with a capital stock of RM 200,000. The company was established in Milbertshofen on the former site of the Munich branch of Flugwerk Deutschland GmbH, a firm at which Karl Rapp had held a leading position and that had gone into liquidation in the summer of 1913. General Consul Auspitzer was the company's sole shareholder, with the operational side of the company managed by Karl Rapp. The company's stated purpose was to build and sell "engines of all types, in particular internal combustion engines for aircraft and motor vehicles".

With the acquisition of Flugwerk Deutschland, the company had also taken over the four-cylinder engines that Karl Rapp had developed there, and Rapp Motorenwerke immediately started to offer these engines to the Prussian military authorities as the Rapp 100 hp. While the 100 hp four-cylinder engine was installed in some contemporary aircraft, it apparently did not find much success with the German military authorities, which by this time were demanding six-cylinder engines due to their smoother operation. In addition to the four-cylinder engine, the design of a 125 hp in-line six-cylinder engine with 215 kg (474 lb) and a displacement of 14.8 L (901 cu in) was started for the second Kaiserpreis (Kaiser's Trophy) aircraft engine competition, but it was not completed in time.

Further engine development based on the Rapp 100 hp led to the 150 hp Rapp Rp III inline-six engine in early 1914. During World War I, the output of the Rapp Rp III engine was increased to about 174 hp (actual 162 hp at 1,400 rpm), but the engine generally achieved only a little success with the German military authorities. A Rapp 200 hp V-8 and a Rapp 300 hp V-12 engine with the same cylinder dimensions, and the 125/145 hp Rapp Rp II V-8 of reduced cylinder dimensions, were also developed.

All of these engine designs were based on the Rapp 100 hp four-cylinder type and had overhead cam, with forged steel liners screwed to cast steel heads. Additionally, all the cylinders were in pairs. The aero engines produced by Rapp were easily distinguished from other aero engines (Mercedes, Benz, Basse und Selve, etc.) because the vertical timing shaft that drove the overhead camshaft came up between the two rearmost cylinder pairs instead of at the rear end.

== Wartime production ==
At the beginning of the First World War, the company was one of the key Bavarian companies for the war effort and appeared to have gained a certain reputation, despite the fact that none of the designs and developments achieved any real success. Since aircraft engine demand could not be met alone by the established companies like Argus, Daimler and Benz, the German military authorities also placed orders for engines with Rapp Motorenwerke. With the influx of capital, the company expanded rapidly and employed 370 workers by end of September 1915.

However, the first deliveries of Rapp engines were rejected by the Prussian Army Administration as unsuitable, and they refrained from further orders. Despite this, the Bavarian Army administration as well as the German Navy administration kept ordering Rapp engines in limited amounts. The Austro-Hungarian Army and the Austro-Hungarian Navy administrations, struggling with insufficient aircraft engine production, also started ordering Rapp Rp II and Rapp Rp III engines. The engines were plagued with various problems like uneven running and vibrations, frequent bearing failures and problems with the carburetion, which had been attributed to inadequate design of the engines in Austro-Hungarian reports.

In response to a commission from the Prussian Army Administration, Karl Rapp further increased the output of his Rapp Rp III engine up to 175 hp. However, the strengthening which this called for also increased the engine weight and vibrations. When the engine failed at the acceptance test in January 1916, no further orders were placed by the German authorities, and the Austro-Hungarian Navy remained the only customer.

Later in 1916, Rapp also introduced a completely redesigned six-cylinder engine with four valves per cylinder, operated by a novel arrangement of pushrods and rocker arms from a single camshaft in the engine block. While considered to be the Rapp IIIa by some sources, the same name has also been used by other authors to refer to the 175 hp version of the Rapp Rp III engine with overhead camshaft. Also the engine size and the choice of four valves per cylinder indicate the engine possibly being of a higher power class, such as the otherwise unknown 250 hp Rapp Rp IV six-cylinder engine. Overall, not much is known about this engine, but apparently it was unable to gain any commercial success and could not improve the situation – the name Rapp had suffered to such an extent that the military departments no longer purchased engines from his company.

Meanwhile, Franz Josef Popp had noted the facilities of Rapp Motorenwerke were ideal for engine production, having the necessary workforce and equipment. Popp lobbied hard to manufacture, by license, the 12-cylinder Austro-Daimler aircraft engine. Popp succeeded in convincing the Bavarian Army Administration and the Imperial Naval Office of the Imperial Austro-Hungarian Army Administration to order Rapp engines licensed through Austro-Daimler. On behalf the Austrian war ministry, Popp was delegated to supervise the handling of the order in Munich.

Popp was also the person who convinced Max Friz, an aircraft engine designer and engineer at Daimler, to come to Munich to assist in development and expansion. With Friz' arrival in 1916, the original Rapp designs were also worked on to create a "high altitude" aero engine that would give the Imperial Army strategic air superiority in combat. 1917 marks the breakthrough by Friz and his team of engineers in developing the type III.

== BMW Type III ==
On 20 May 1917, Rapp Motorenwerke registered the documentation for the construction design for the new engine, dubbed "type III". Friz' design, (based on Karl Rapp's original design) was laid out as an in-line six-cylinder, which guaranteed optimum balance, with few small vibrations. The engine was successful, but the real breakthrough came in 1917, when Friz integrated a basically simple throttle butterfly into the "high-altitude carburettor", enabling the engine to develop its full power high above the ground. This is precisely the reason why the engine, now dubbed "type IIIa", had unique superiority in air combat. Franz-Zeno Diemer, the pioneering aviator and test pilot for the company, sets a new world altitude record with a 32,000 ft (9,760 m) flight in 1919 flying a DFW F 37/III (experimental two-seater, often referred to as the C-IV) with a BMW Type IV aircraft engine. September of the same year, Diemer set another world altitude record- this one for a passenger aircraft (8 people on board, 6,750 meters) in a Junkers F 13 powered by a BMW IIIa aircraft engine.

== Change of name ==
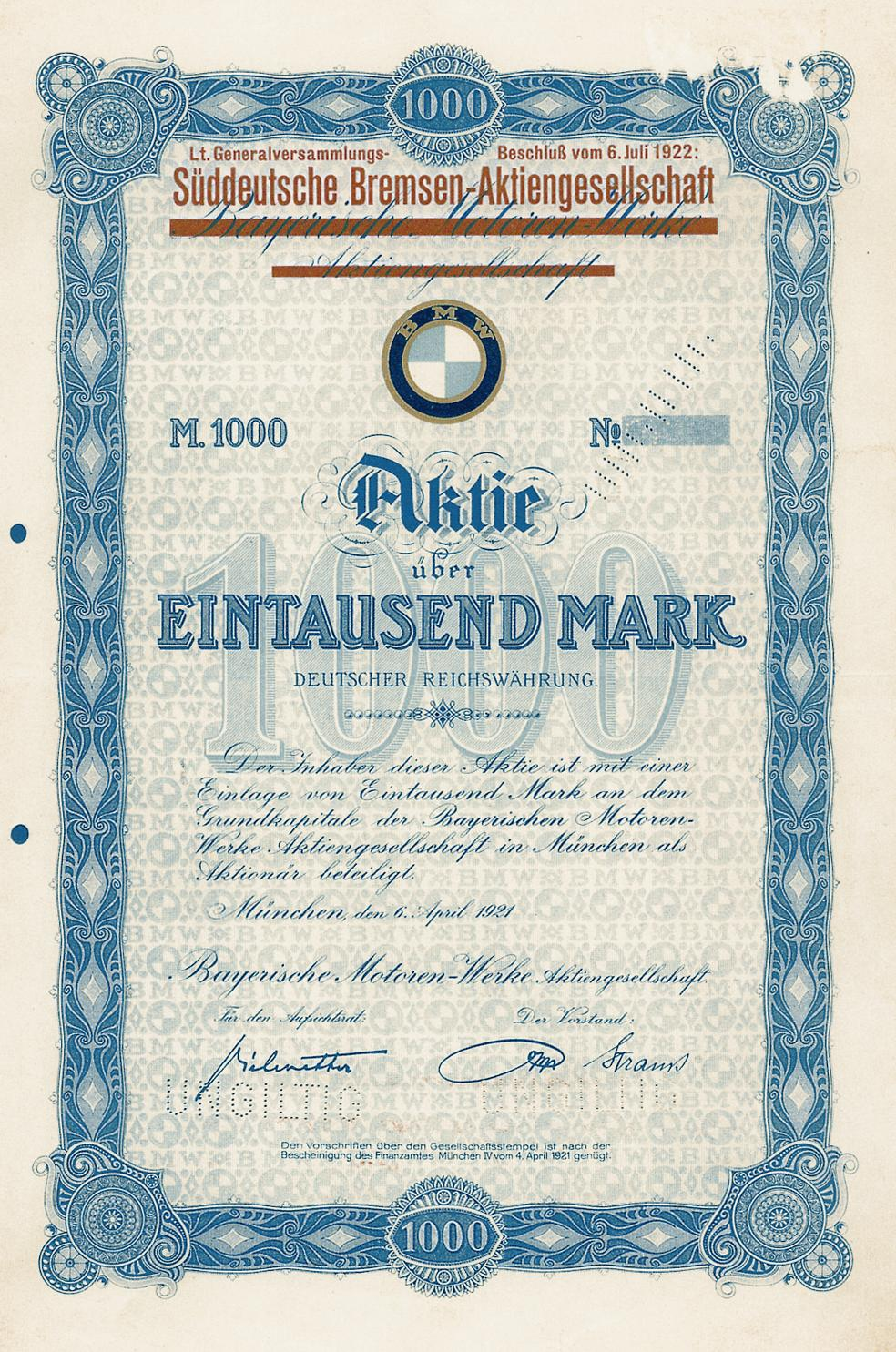
Share certificate with the BMW logo showing the change of name from Bayerische Motoren Werke to Süddeutsche Bremsen in 1922

The decision by the Prussian Army Administration to order 600 units of the innovative high-altitude aero engine (project name "BBE") prompted reorganizing the legal structure of the company. The aero engine developed by Friz had turned Rapp Motorenwerke into an essential contributor to the war effort virtually overnight. From the middle of 1917 onward, the business, which would probably have disappeared from history never to be heard of again, now enjoyed the undivided attention of the armed services and other governmental bodies. Large subsidies flowed in and the Munich company received well-financed production orders.

The recognition that Max Friz gained with his engine made it clear to all the senior managers that, up to now, Karl Rapp and his inadequate engine designs had held the company back from success. In Friz, they now had an excellent chief designer on hand and were no longer dependent on Rapp. Therefore, on 25 July 1917, the partners in the company terminated Karl Rapp's contract.

The end of this collaboration had been coming for a long time. When Karl Rapp's departure was finally a certainty, another important decision had to be made. If the man who had lent his name to the company was now leaving it, a new name was naturally required. As a result, on 21 July 1917, Rapp Motorenwerke GmbH was renamed to Bayerische Motoren Werke GmbH. It was thus the first company to bear this name and to use the acronym "BMW".

The departure of Karl Rapp enabled a fundamental restructuring of the company. While the development side was placed under Max Friz as chief designer, Franz Josef Popp took over the post of managing director. Until the end of the war, aero engines remained the company's only product. The BBE aero engine project was a big success under the designation BMW IIIa.

In 1922, the company changed its name to Süddeutsche Bremsen-AG after the BMW name and engine-making assets were transferred to Bayerische Flugzeugwerke, which had been known as Otto Flugmaschinenfabrik earlier in its history. Bayerische Flugzeugwerke was then renamed to Bayerische Motoren Werke AG, and it evolved into the automaker that is now known as BMW.

== See also ==
- History of BMW
- Knorr-Bremse
