= Max Friz =

German engineer

- Born: October 1, 1883; Urach
- Died: June 9, 1966 (aged 82); Tegernsee
- Education: Royal Building Trade School in Stuttgart-Esslingen
- Occupation: Mechanical Engineering
- Employer: Bayerische Motoren Werke GmbH (BMW)
- Known for: Critical contributions to the founding of BMW AG
- Title: Chief Designer/ Chief Engineer
- Term: 1916–1945

Max Friz (October 1, 1883 – June 9, 1966) was a German mechanical engineer specializing in engine design. He was the key contributor of engine design and innovation that led to the founding of Bayerische Motoren Werke GmbH (BMW) in 1917.

== Early life ==
Assumed to be originally from Urach, very little is known about Friz' youth. It is known however, that at a young age, he apprenticed to the Kuhn steam engine company in Cannstatt starting in 1898. In 1902, he enrolled at the Royal Building Trade School in Stuttgart-Esslingen furthering his engineering skills. In 1906, he was employed by Daimler Motoren Gesellschaft, in the Design Office, making major contributions to the design of the racing engine for the 1914 Mercedes Grand Prix car that won the French Grand Prix.

Friz designed the first practical German aircraft engines in 1912-1913 while at Austro-Daimler. The engines had separate cylinders on the crankcase and an overhead camshaft driven by a vertical shaft and bevel gears. At the end of 1916 the young engineer Max Friz applied for a position with Rapp Motorenwerke. At that time Friz was still working for the Daimler engine company in Untertürkheim, near Stuttgart. However, he was frustrated because the chief engineer, Paul Daimler, ignored the suggestions of his young assistant on engine development. Faced with this situation, Friz remembered his former colleague, Karl Rapp. At first Rapp was going to turn down Friz's request; however, Josef Popp successfully intervened on Friz's behalf, because he recognized that Rapp Motorenwerke lacked an able designer.

At the Daimler engine company, Max Friz had tried in vain to develop an oversized, high-compression engine, but Paul Daimler had firmly committed himself to supercharger technology. Not until he had moved to Munich was Friz able to put his own ideas for a high-altitude engine into practice. In the space of a few weeks he designed a new aero-engine, which, with an innovative carburettor and a variety of other technical details, was superior to any other German aero-engine. Later, this engine would gain world renown under the designation "BMW IIIa".

== Aircraft engines ==
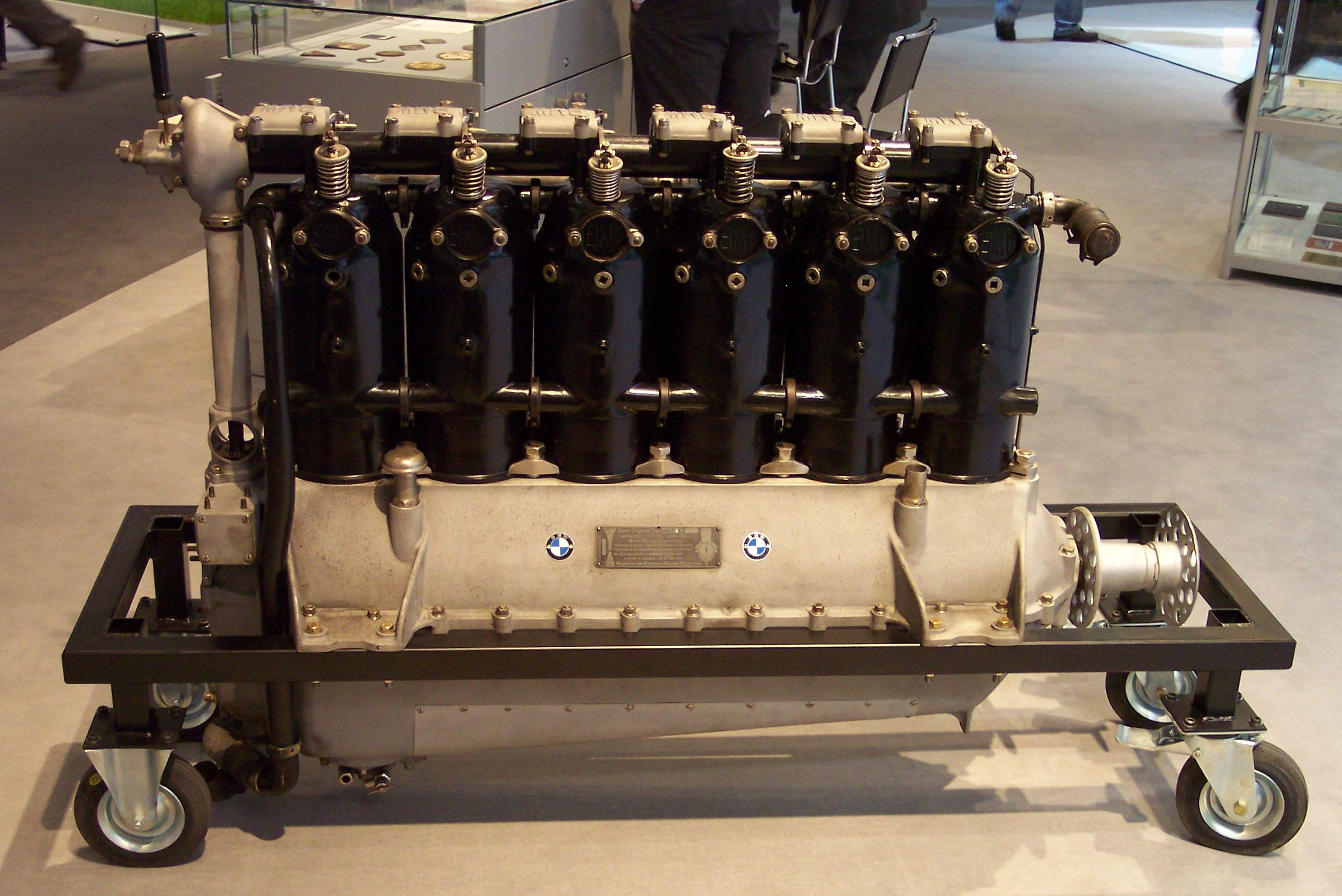
BMW IVa- This engine set the World Altitude record in 1919 by Franz Zeno Diemer

Upon arriving at Rapp Motorenwerke, Friz was tasked to develop an aircraft engine that could attain very high altitudes as well as be durable and aerodynamically favorable. A higher operational flight ceiling was a critical strategic advantage for the pilot (since the atmospheric pressure decreases the higher a pilot flies a plane, a conventional engine at this time literally stalled out above 3,000 meters).

In the spring of 1917, at the time Friz was working at the drawing board on his groundbreaking engine, the outlook for Rapp Motorenwerke was bad. The Army High Command wanted to commit itself to a few types of aircraft and aeroengine and then get these built under license by several companies. In the spring of 1917 a commission from the Reichswehr therefore inspected the Rapp engine plant. They had to decide which engines would in future have to be produced under license in Munich. In the end, the Rapp management was faced with the choice of manufacturing either Daimler or Benz engines. However, Franz Josef Popp seized the opportunity of presenting the new engine to the commission of experts, an engine which up to now had only existed in Max Friz's drawings.

The interest shown by the officers was considerable, and soon there was no more talk of the Rapp engine factory being relegated to the rank of a mere assembler. In fact, the Reichswehr was so impressed by the new engine that it placed an order for 600 units, even before a single prototype had been produced. The aeroengine developed by Friz had turned Rapp Motorenwerke into an essential contributor to the war effort virtually overnight.

On 20 May 1917, Rapp Motorenwerke registered the documentation for the construction design for the new engine, dubbed project "BBE". Friz' design, based on Karl Rapp's design) was laid out as an in-line six-cylinder, which guaranteed optimum balance, therefore few, small vibrations. The engine was successful, but the real breakthrough came in 1917, when Friz integrated a basically simple throttle butterfly into the "high-altitude carburettor", enabling the engine to develop its full power high above the ground. This is precisely the reason why the engine, now dubbed "Type IIIa", had unique superiority in air combat. The water-cooled in-line 6-cylinder engine's reputation grew very quickly. Franz-Zeno Diemer, the pioneering aviator, sets a new world altitude record with a 32,000 ft (9760 m) flight in 1919 using the BMW IVa engine.

It was the success of this engine that allowed the company to grow exceptionally fast, necessitating the restructuring of the company. In 1917, Rapp Motorenwerke is renamed Bayerische Motoren Werke GmbH the predecessor to the modern day BMW AG. Friz, as design director for BMW, designed further aircraft engines which strengthened BMW's reputation still further in later years.

== Motorcycles ==
With World War I over, the company was forbidden from aircraft design. This necessitated the need for new avenues of growth for the company. Friz, with his designs and engineering expertise, launches BMW into the motorcycle market with the development of the R32 motorcycle, which established the foundation for all future boxer powered BMW motorcycles (in addition to numerous motorsport titles and world records).

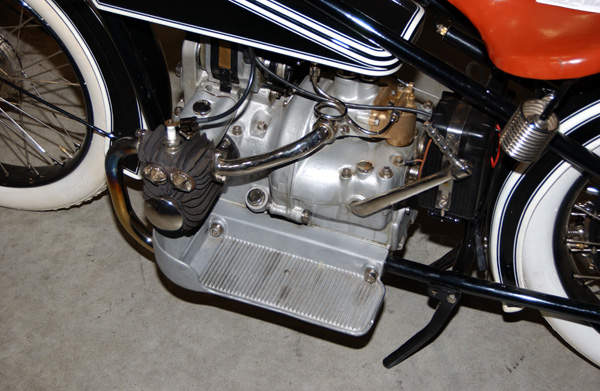
The boxer engine in an R32

Friz and his team of engineers design the first "boxer" (or opposed twin) engine was the fore-and-aft M2B15, based on a British Douglas design. It was manufactured by BMW in 1921/1922 but mostly used in other brands of motorcycles, notably Victoria of Nuremberg. The M2B15 proved to be moderately successful and BMW used it in its own Helios motorcycle. BMW also developed and manufactured a small 2-stroke motorcycle called the "Flink" for a short time. When BMW GmbH went public in 1922, Friz was named the first Chief Engineer and design director of BMW AG, a post he would hold until 1937.

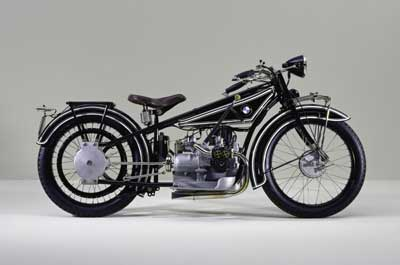
The 1924 R32 motorcycle

With the development of its first light alloy cylinder head, a much more significant "across the frame" version of the boxer engine was designed. In 1923 the R32 debuted at the Paris Auto Show, and caused quite a sensation among engineers and consumers alike. Using the new aluminum alloy cylinders, Friz designed a 486 cc (29.7 cu in) engine with 8.5 hp (6.3 kW) and a top speed of 95–100 km/h (59–62 mph). The R32 was the second major product Friz designed for his company, effectively keeping the company solvent during a difficult time.

The engine and gear box formed a bolt-up single unit. At a time when many motorcycle manufacturers used a total-loss oiling systems, the new BMW engine featured a recirculating wet-sump oiling system. However, it was not a "high-pressure oil" system based on shell bearings and tight clearances that we are familiar with, but a drip feed to roller bearings. This system was used by BMW until 1969. The wet-sump system was not overly common on motorcycles until the 1970s and the arrival of Japanese motorcycles. Until then, many manufacturers had used dry sump, with an external oil-tank made of sheet-metal.

== Automobiles ==
Friz was appointed to General Manager of BMW-Flugmotorenbau GmbH, Munich in 1934, and was there until 1937. With BMW continued growth into automobiles, Friz succeeded Leo C. Grass as General Manager of Flugmotorenfabrik Eisenach GmbH, overseeing development of automobile engine design and development. Friz retired from BMW in 1945. He was honored with an Honorary Doctorate from the Munich College of Advanced Technology in 1954.

Friz died in Tegernsee on June 9, 1966.

== See also ==
- History of BMW
