= Otto C.I =

C.I
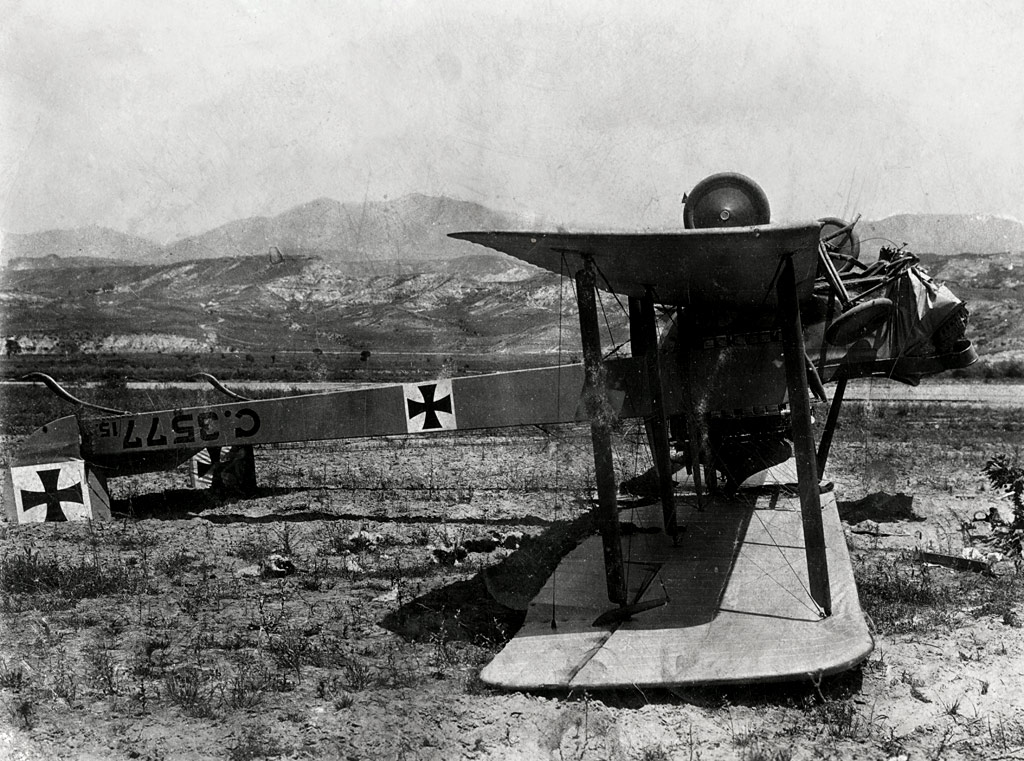
- Upturned Otto C.I after an accident near Thessaloniki

General information
- Type: Reconnaissance, bomber
- National origin: Germany
- Manufacturer: Otto Flugmaschinenfabrik
- Designer: Gustav Otto
- Primary users: Bulgarian Air Force Luftstreitkräfte
- Number built: 25

History
- First flight: 1915
- Retired: 1917

The Otto C.I, also known as the Otto KD.15, was a German two-seat biplane reconnaissance and bomber aircraft of the First World War designed and produced by Otto Flugmaschinenfabrik. The C.I was a rare example of an aircraft flown by the Central Powers which had a pusher configuration.

== Design and development ==
The German aeronautical engineer Gustav Otto designed the C.I as a reconnaissance aircraft for use by the Imperial German Flying Corps. It was an all wooden, fabric covered twin boom design with box-shaped booms. Forward was a large fuselage gondola with two seats, the observer sitting at the fore and the pilot to the rear. Behind the pilot was a six-cylinder engine driving a pusher propeller.

The unarmed prototype first flew in May or June 1915, named KD.15 and powered by a 150 kW (200 hp) Rapp engine. Production examples were given the official designation C.I and the observer was provided with a single machine gun for defence. The Rapp engine proved unreliable so production aircraft were also equipped with the lower-powered 120 kW (160 hp) Mercedes D.III or 112 kW (150 hp) Benz Bz.III.

The aircraft was produced in small numbers and proved to be the last made by the company. It is unrelated to the C.II made under license for LVG by Otto.

== Operational history ==
The C.I entered very limited service with the Imperial German Air Service, serving only with Bavarian Feldflieger Abteilung like 4b, 8b and 9b. They were delivered in two batches, each of six aircraft, ordered in August and November 1915 respectively, and served until at least April 1916.

Initially considered "good for nothing" by the Bavarian airmen who first flew them, the aircraft gained a positive reputation during their short careers. They were favourably viewed for their stability and reliability yet were nimble with good handling characteristics both on the ground and in the air.

The aircraft saw limited export success, being sold to the Bulgarian Air Force in 1915. Thirteen were delivered to Bozhurishte in spring 1916, serving with 2 Aeroplane Otdelenie based at Udovo. The first batch was powered by the Benz engine, while the latter used the slightly more powerful Mercedes inline. These aircraft were used in the bombing and reconnaissance role. They served until 1917, when they were replaced by the more capable Albatros C.III.

== Operators ==
Kingdom of Bulgaria

- Bulgarian Air Force

German Empire

- Luftstreitkräfte

== Specification ==
Data from German Aircraft of the First World War

General characteristics

- Crew: 2
- Length: 9.60 m (31 ft 6 in)
- Wingspan: 14.50 m (47 ft 5 in)
- Wing area: 47 m^{2} (510 sq ft)
- Empty weight: 915 kg (2,017 lb)
- Max takeoff weight: 1,500 kg (3,307 lb)
- Powerplant: 1 × Benz Bz.III six-cylinder, water-cooled, inline engine, 112 kW (150 hp)

Performance

- Maximum speed: 130 km/h (81 mph, 70 kn)

Armament

- Guns: 1 x Parabellum MG 14 machine guns
- Bombs: 6 × 10 kilograms (22 lb) bombs for a total of 60 kilograms (130 lb)

== See also ==
Aircraft of comparable role, configuration, and era

- Airco DH.1
- AGO C.I
- Farman F.40
- Häfeli DH-1
- Voisin VI

Related lists

- List of aircraft
