= Rochet-Schneider =

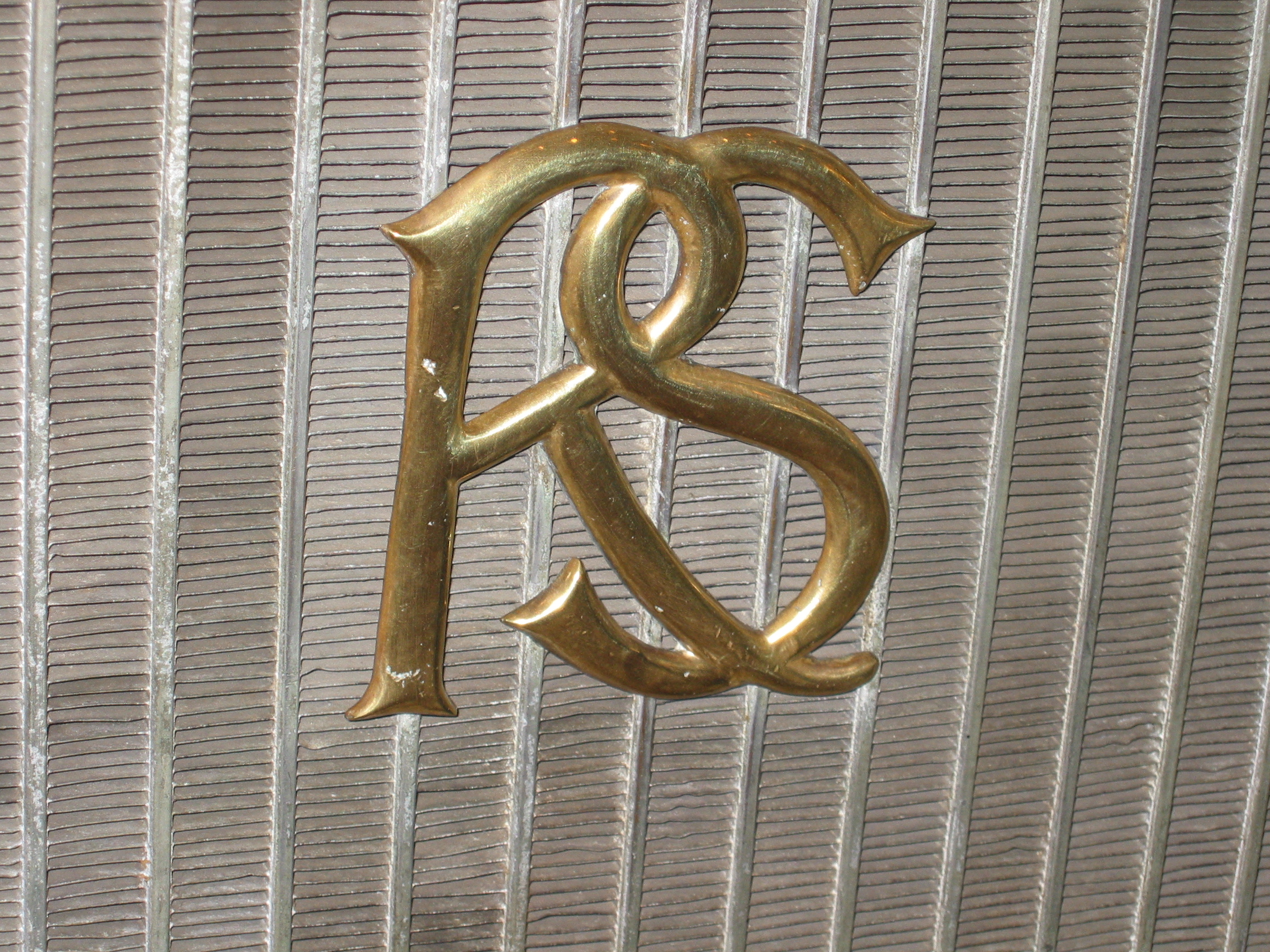

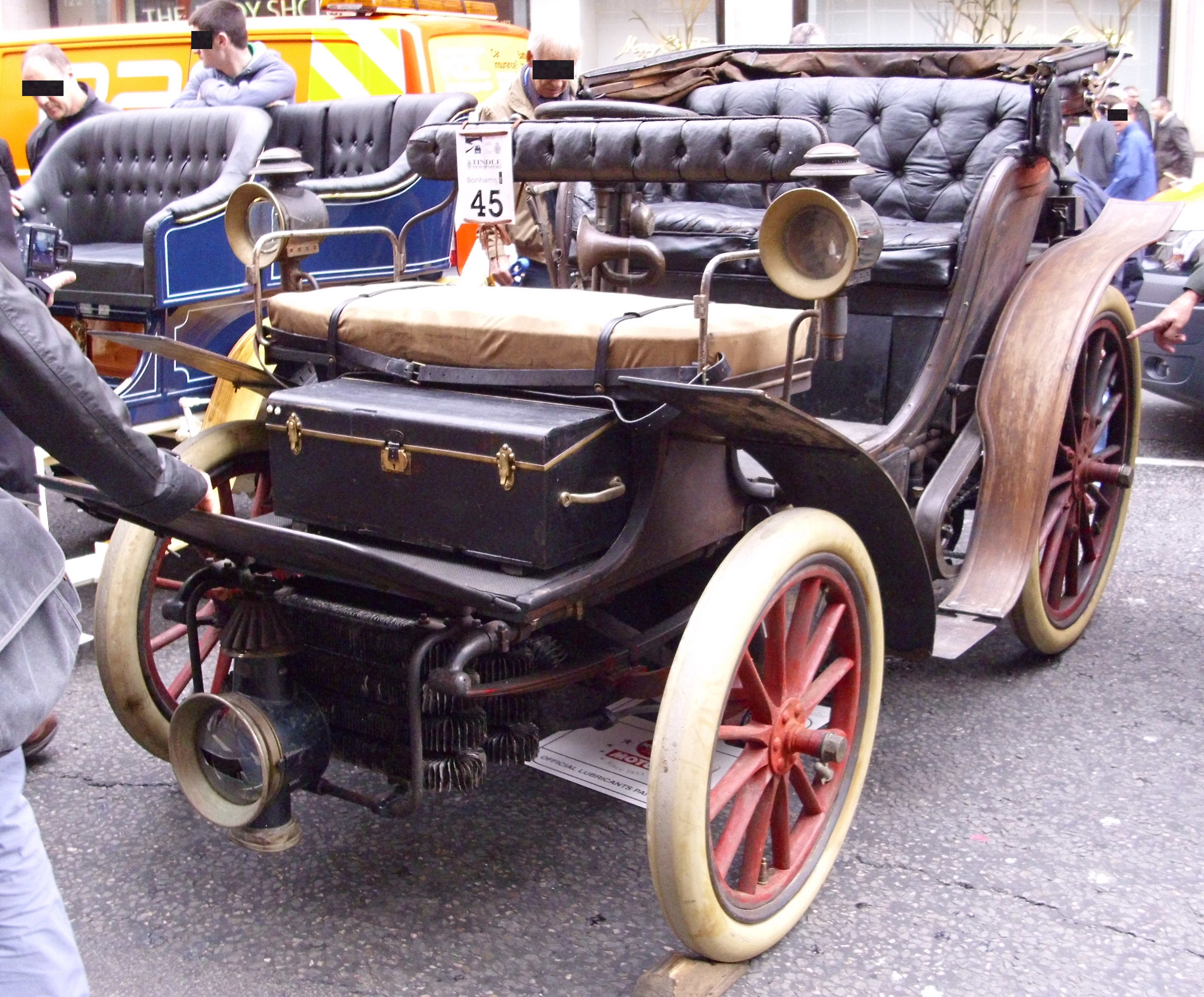
- Industry: vehicle construction
- Founded: 1894
- Defunct: 1932
- Headquarters: Lyon, France
- Key people: Edouard Rochet; Eugène Schneider
- Products: Automobiles

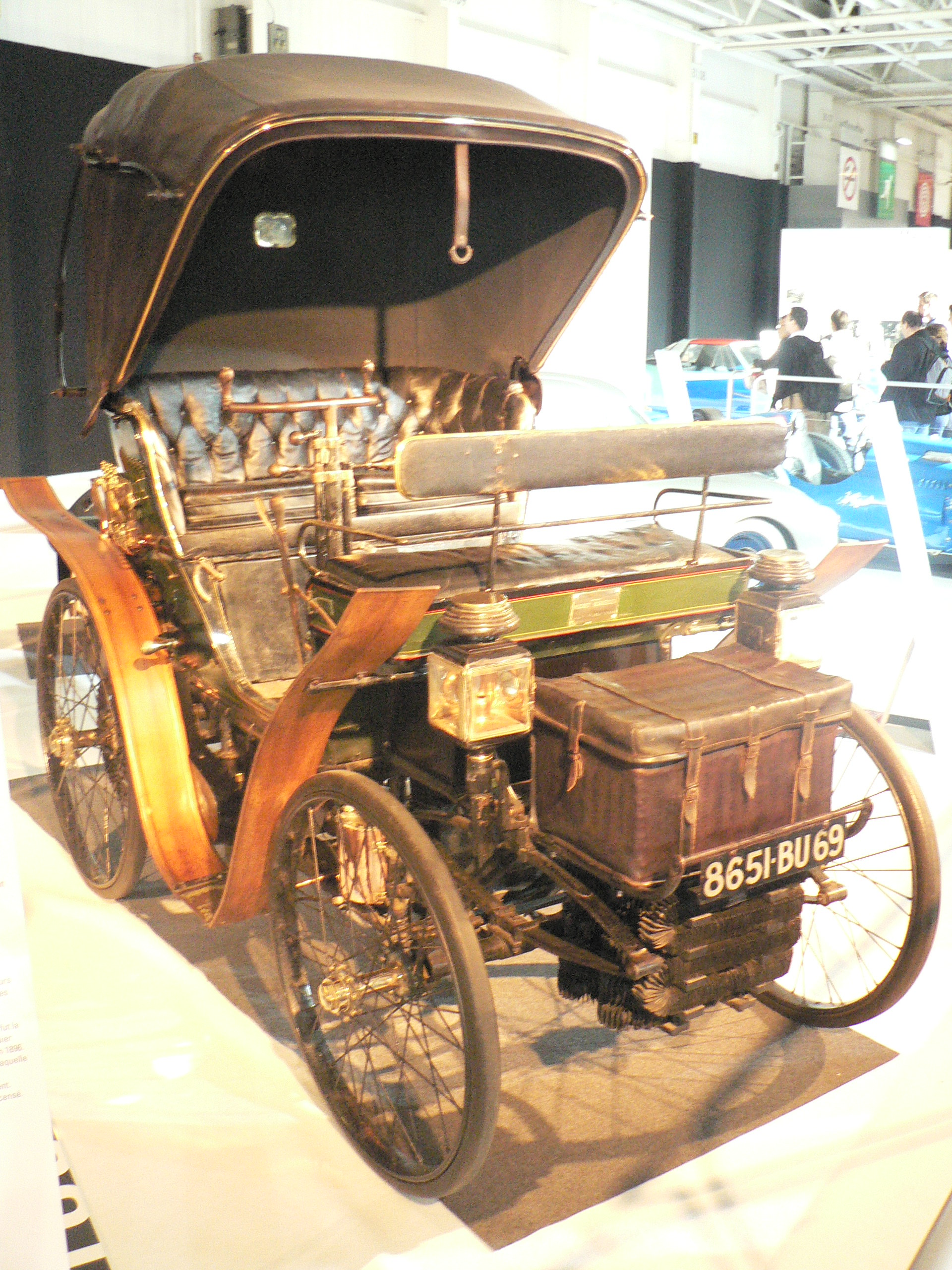
early Rochet-Schneider

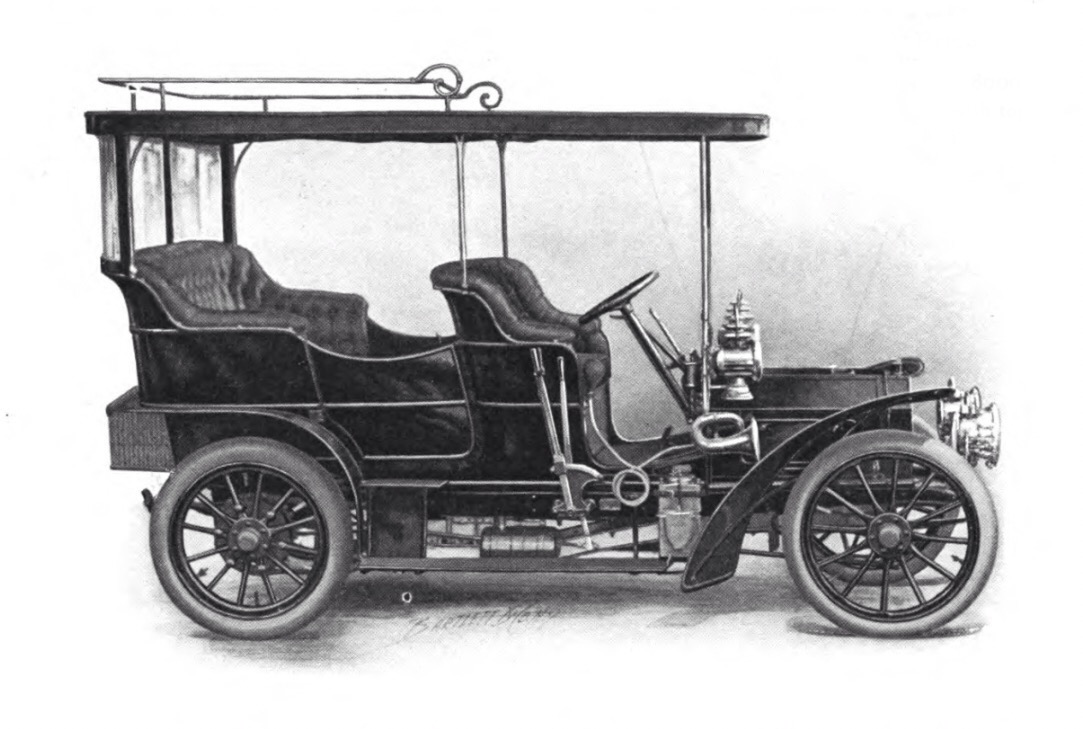
Rochet-Schneider 24-35 CV (1905)

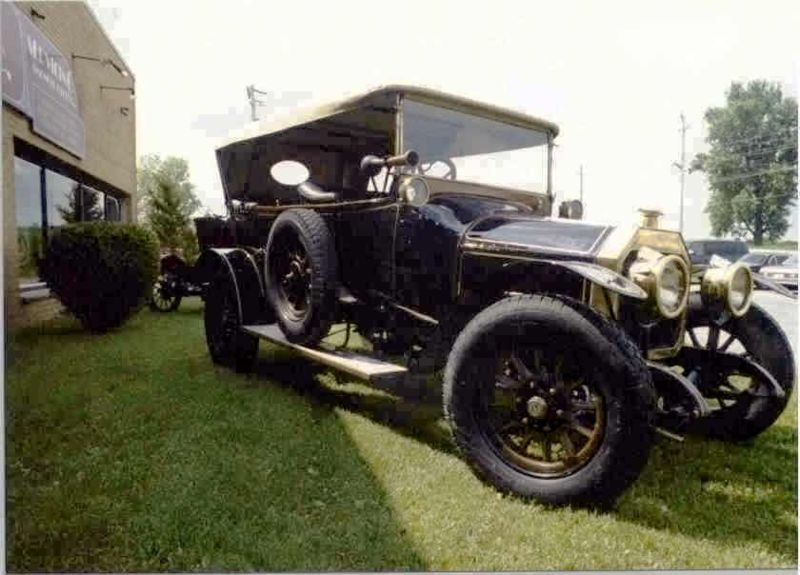
1914 Rochet-Schneider

Rochet-Schneider was a French company that produced automobiles between 1894 and 1932. It was based in Lyon. The Rochet-Schneider sales slogan was "strength, simplicity and silence".

Like other motorcars of the Brass Era, the cars made by Rochet-Schneider were largely intended for wealthy hobbyists and made use of brass fittings, pattern leather, hand-crafted wood and other expensive components.

== Early period ==
Edouard Rochet and his father were bicycle manufacturers before entering motorcar production. In 1894 they were joined by Théophile Schneider, a relative of the eponymous armaments family.

Between 1895 and 1901, the company built approximately 240 single-cylinder "Benz-type" cars. At the 1901 Paris Salon, the company introduced a range of two and four-cylinder cars. Around 1903, these were redesigned along similar lines to Mercedes.

== Rochet-Schneider Ltd. ==
By this time, Rochet-Schneider had become one of the most respected car manufacturers in France. In 1904 the company was sold for 4.5 million francs and a London-based company called "Rochet-Schneider Ltd." was formed. Production averaged less than 250 cars a year and by late 1907 the company was in liquidation.

== Carburateurs Zenith ==
Théophile Schneider bought the company bearing his name and a subsidiary called "Société du carburateur Zénith" was formed. Schneider produced a range of high-quality cars and commercial vehicles for several years.

== Post war ==
Following World War I, the company offered 12, 18 and 30 hp cars. By 1923 the whole range was fitted with overhead valve engines of entirely new design and a variety of coachwork styles.

Rochet-Schneider took a stand at the 20th Paris Motor Show in October 1926, and exhibited their five model range. Prices quoted below are the manufacturers' prices for cars in "bare chassis" form, leaving the customer to make his own arrangements in respect of a car body:

- Rochet-Schneider 12CV 4-cylinder side-valve engine: wheelbase 3,030 mm (119 in) priced at 42,000 francs
- Rochet-Schneider 14CV 4-cylinder side-valve engine: wheelbase 3,200 mm (130 in) priced at 55,000 francs
- Rochet-Schneider 18CV 4-cylinder side-valve engine: wheelbase 3,400 mm (130 in) priced at 50,000 francs
- Rochet-Schneider 20CV 6-cylinder side-valve engine: wheelbase 3,440 mm (135 in) priced at 79,000 francs
- Rochet-Schneider 30CV 6-cylinder side-valve engine: wheelbase 3,570 mm (141 in) priced at 67,000 francs

From the mid-1920s onwards the company placed growing emphasis on commercial vehicles although passenger cars were still being sold and still being exhibited on the manufacturer's stand at the 25th Paris Motor Show in October 1931, the manufacturer's last new model being the formidable Rochet-Schneider 26CV with a large 6-cylinder engine of approximately 5-litres displacement along with dual ignition and servo brakes.

Rochet-Schneider was bought by Berliet, another Lyon based company, by that time known as a manufacturer of locomotives and commercial vehicles, following the World War II.

== Production models ==
- Rochet-Schneider 30/35

== Examples ==
There is a 1900 Rochet-Schneider on display at Larz Anderson Auto Museum in Brookline, Massachusetts.
