= Flugwerk Deutschland GmbH =

Flugwerk Deutschland GmbH was a German aircraft manufacturer based in Brand, a district of Aachen.

Its articles of association were ratified on February 15, 1912, and the entry in the Aachen Commercial Register was effected on March 5, 1912. Düsseldorf engineer Carl von Voigt was the Chairman of the Board of Management. The business made and sold aircraft, machinery and equipment and operated airfields and aerodromes. Flugwerk Deutschland manufactured several biplanes and a monoplane.

The company took part in the General Air Show in Berlin in 1912.

The Taube (German for dove) had been developed in 1910 by Igo Etrich, and was built in large numbers by various manufacturers, including Flugwerk Deutschland. The Taube got its name from the structure and shape of its wings. A slow, unarmed, two-seater monoplane, it entered service in the first year of World War I and was used for observation and reconnaissance until 1916.

A branch was set up for aeroengine production at Schleissheimerstrasse 8 in Munich-Milbertshofen in 1912 and Karl Rapp and Joseph Wirth were given power of attorney in Munich, on May 20, 1912. Karl Rapp designed the Flugwerk Deutschland FD 1416 four-cylinder aeroengine of nominal 100 / 90 hp (75 / 67 kW) at 1,300 / 1,100 rpm in 1912, which then competed at the German Kaiserpreis aircraft engine contest of 1912/13 but was not successful. The Flugwerk Deutschland engine later became the basis for most of Karl Rapps other engine designs.

The company was dissolved by a resolution of the shareholders on April 16, 1913, and Joseph Wirth was appointed as sole liquidator. After the liquidation process had been brought to an end, the company was wound up on August 8, 1916.
