= Kaiserpreis for aircraft engines =

1912-13 German aircraft engine design competition

The Kaiserpreis for aircraft engines, or more precisely Kaiserpreis für den besten deutschen Flugzeugmotor (German: Emperor's Prize for the best German aircraft engine), was an aircraft engine competition endowed by Emperor Wilhelm II with 50,000 Mark in 1912. The price money was supplemented to a total of 125,000 Mark by various institutions of the German Empire and the Prussian State. The prize was awarded in 1913 to the Benz FX four-cylinder engine produced by Benz & Cie., Rheinische Automobil- und Motorenfabrik AG, Mannheim.

== History ==
On 27 January 1912, his birthday, Emperor Wilhelm II enacted that on his next birthday a prize money of 50,000 Mark should be paid to the manufacturer, whose engine had been ruled the best German aircraft engine after a trial. The initiative for this engine contest originated at his brother Prince Henry of Prussia, and Emperor Wilhelm II endowed the prize with his private money. Various institutions of the German Empire and the Prussian State supplemented the money so that also the 2nd though 5h place could be remunerated with a price money.

After the Kaiserpreis aircraft engine contest was announced in April 1912, a committee was established and a prize jury of seven experts, consisting of six professors and one expert of the German Imperial Naval Office, was formed. A newly formed independent institution, the Verein Deutsche Versuchsanstalt für Luftfahrt e. V. (DVL) in Berlin-Adlershof, was tasked with conducting the engine trials. The exact terms and regulations for the contest as well as the amount of the prize money were then published on 7 May 1912.

The price money and the prospect of lucrative government contracts attracted much interest. Beginning with July 44 engines from 26 contenders were submitted and many contenders also submitted replacement engines, which were allowed to be used in case an engine failure occurred without the contenders fault. Altogether 65 engines, including the replacement engines, were admitted to the contest, but only 26 engines and 17 replacement engines from 14 contenders were delivered by the deadline of 25 October. The engine trials were conducted by the DVL beginning with mid of November 1912.

== Results ==
- The Kaiserpreis, with a prize money of 50,000 Mark, was awarded to the 100 hp Benz FX four-cylinder engine produced by Benz & Cie., Rheinische Automobil- und Motorenfabrik AG, Mannheim.
- The second prize, the Reichskanzlerpreis (German: Prize of the Chancellor) with a prize money of 30,000 Mark, was awarded to the 90 hp six-cylinder Mercedes engine of the Daimler-Motoren-Gesellschaft.
- the third prize, with a prize money of 25,000 Mark, was awarded to the 97 hp four-cylinder engine of the Neue Automobil-Gesellschaft (NAG).
- the fourth prize, with a prize money of 10,000 Mark, was awarded to the 72 hp four-cylinder Mercedes engine, again by Daimler-Motoren-Gesellschaft.
- the fifth prize, with a prize money of 10,000 Mark, was awarded to 98 hp four-cylinder Argus-engine from the Argus Motoren Gesellschaft.
