= Société du carburateur Zénith =

French company, makers of carburettors

- Industry: machinery industry and plant construction
- Headquarters: Lyon

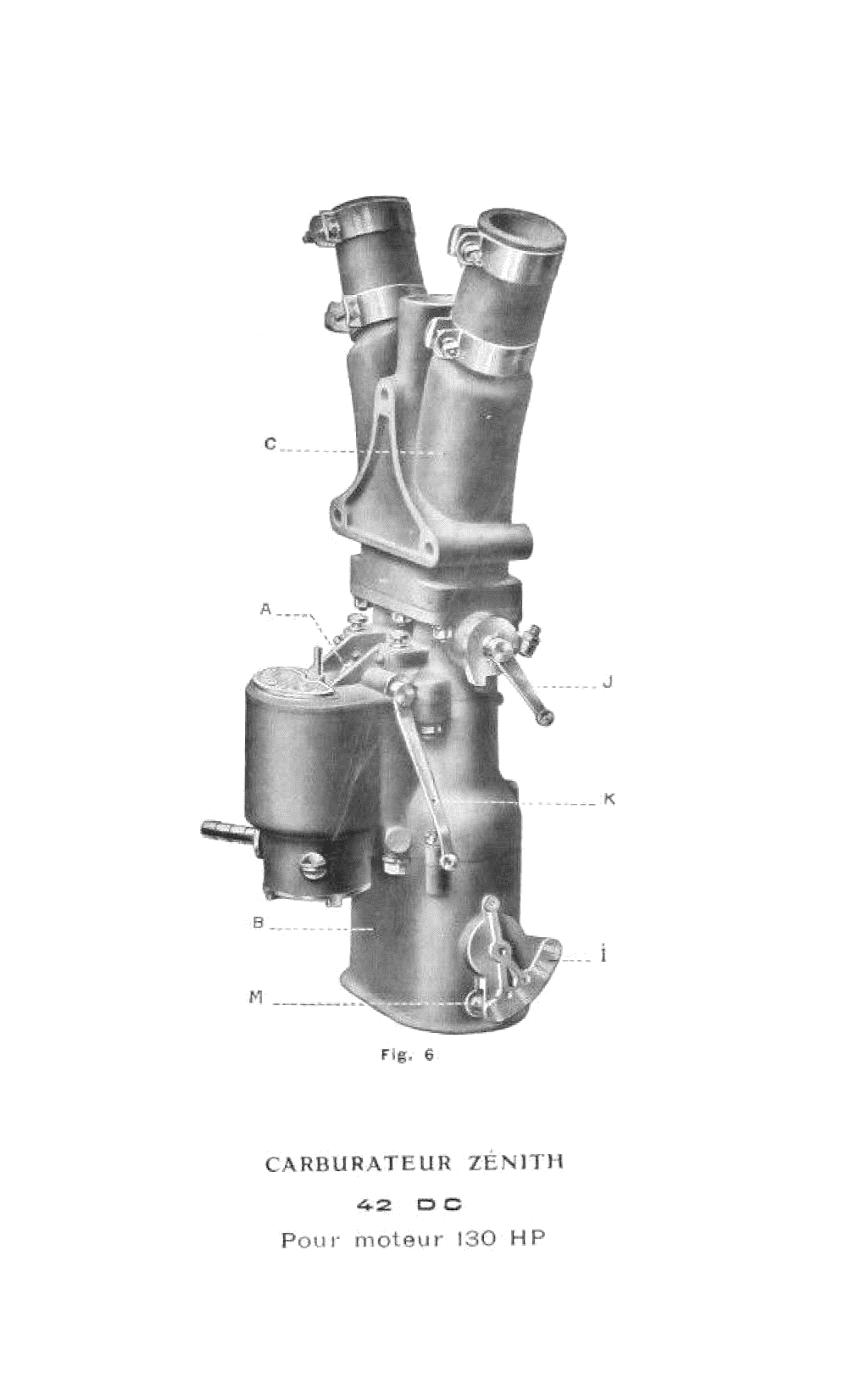
Zénith 42 DC carburetor for Renault 130 hp aircraft engines.

Société du carburateur Zénith (French for Zenith carburetor company) was a French corporation specialized in the making of carburettors for both automotive and aerospace industries. Created in Lyon in 1909 by car manufacturer Rochet-Schneider, it was taken over in 1970 by German company DVG. One of the main carburetor manufacturers of the 20th century, it had factories in Lyon and abroad, including in the United States and the United Kingdom.

== History ==
=== Origins ===
In 1903, 1873-born François Baverey bought a Lorraine-Dietrich car. Finding that its engine did not work well, he came to realize this was due to the carburettor not being able to adjust the air/fuel ratio to the engine speed. Although not an engineer, Baverey had a keen interest in mathematics and physics. In 1905, he started working on a new model of carburettor equipped with two fuel nozzles, the second of whom allowed the mixture to keep the same ratio independently of the engine speed. He applied for patent on 30 June 1906 in France, and then in the United Kingdom, the United States, the German Empire and Italy. A keen astronomy hobbyist, Baverey choose to name his carb after the zenith.

Édouard Rochet, one of Baverey's friends, was a director at Rochet-Schneider. During summer 1906, he offered him access to that company's workshops and laboratories in Monplaisir, 3rd arrondissement of Lyon. In September, Rochet-Schneider and Baverey came to an agreement, upon which the inventor was selling his patents to the car manufacturer, and agreed to make them aware of any further improvement he would make to his invention. As a counterpart, Rochet-Schneider would pay him for every carburettor they would make, plus 40% of every license fee they would get, both in France and abroad. Production of Zénith carburettors then started at the Rochet-Schneider factory, and by 1908 every car they produced was fitted with one. By 1909, another auto maker of Lyon, Cottin & Desgouttes, had switched to the exclusive use of Zénith carburettors.

=== 1909: a new company ===
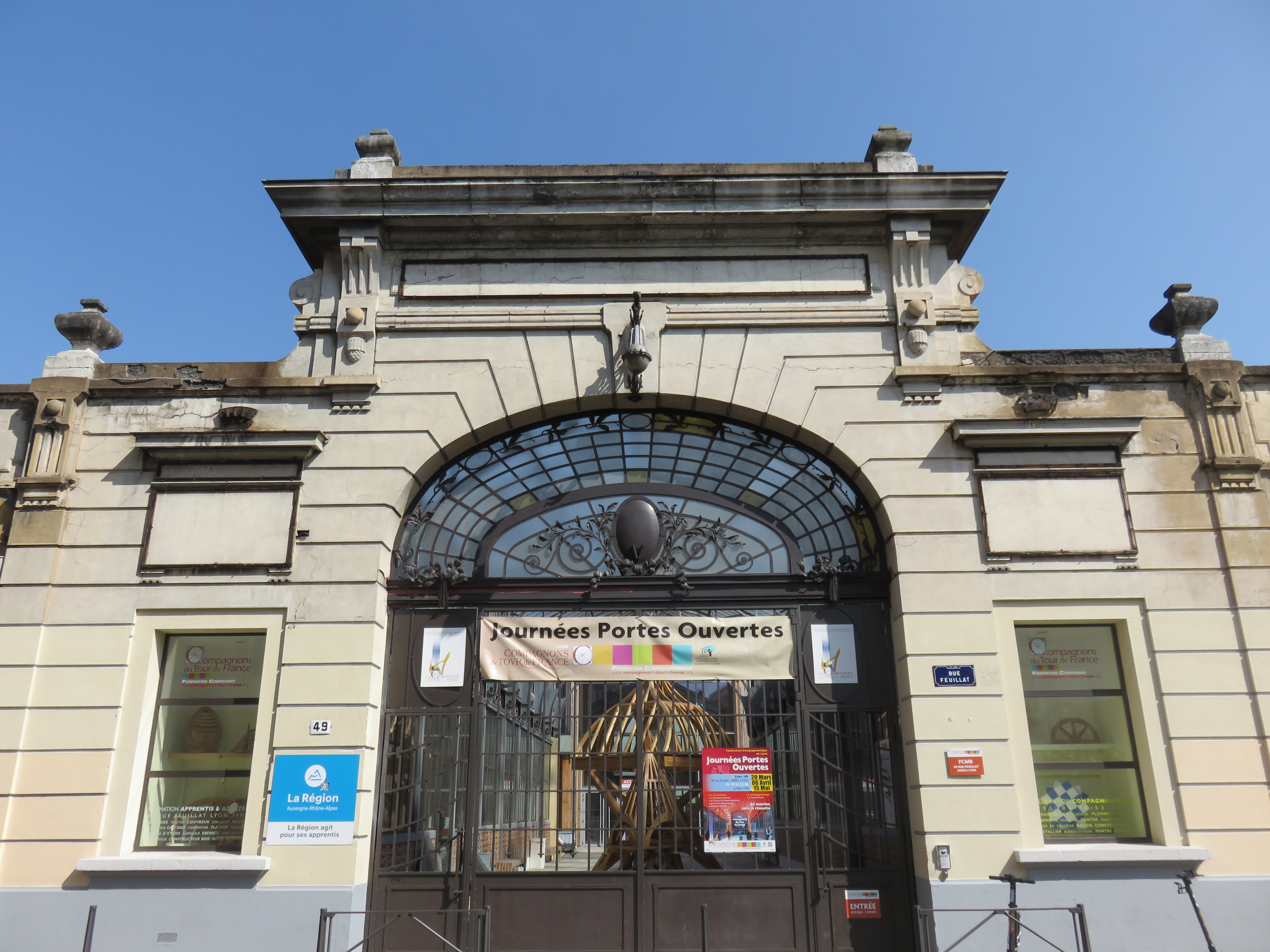
1913 gate to the Société du Carburateur Zénith factory in Lyon.

Zénith carburettors being in high demand, with 2,740 items manufactured in 1907–1908, and production licenses sold to Cottin & Desgouttes, De Dion-Bouton and Peugeot, Rochet-Schneider decided it was time to create a new company, and thus Société du carburateur Zénith was created in July 1909 as a société anonyme. The main shareholder was Rochet-Schneider, with 88% of the 50,000 francs capital. The CEO of the new company was Amédée Boulade, with Baverey retained as head engineer. Rochet-Schneider lent part of their own premises to the Société. The first carb made by the now-independent company was the Zénith type D, which included a throttle.

Société du carburateur Zénith then went international. Subsidiaries controlling their own factories were created abroad as joint-stock companies to produce and sell Zenith carburettors abroad. The first one was created in Berlin in 1910, then in 1911 the Zenith Carburetor Company of Detroit, Michigan in the United States. The Zenith Carburettor Company of Stanmore, London, England, followed suit in 1912; and finally a last subsidiary was created in Turin, Italy, in 1916. From 1909 to 1916, the parent company and its subsidiaries saw their profit double every year. With such riches flowing, the company was able to afford the services of architect Louis Payet, who designed a majestic gate for the Lyon factory in 1913, opening on a steel and glass industrial style long gallery.

=== First World war ===
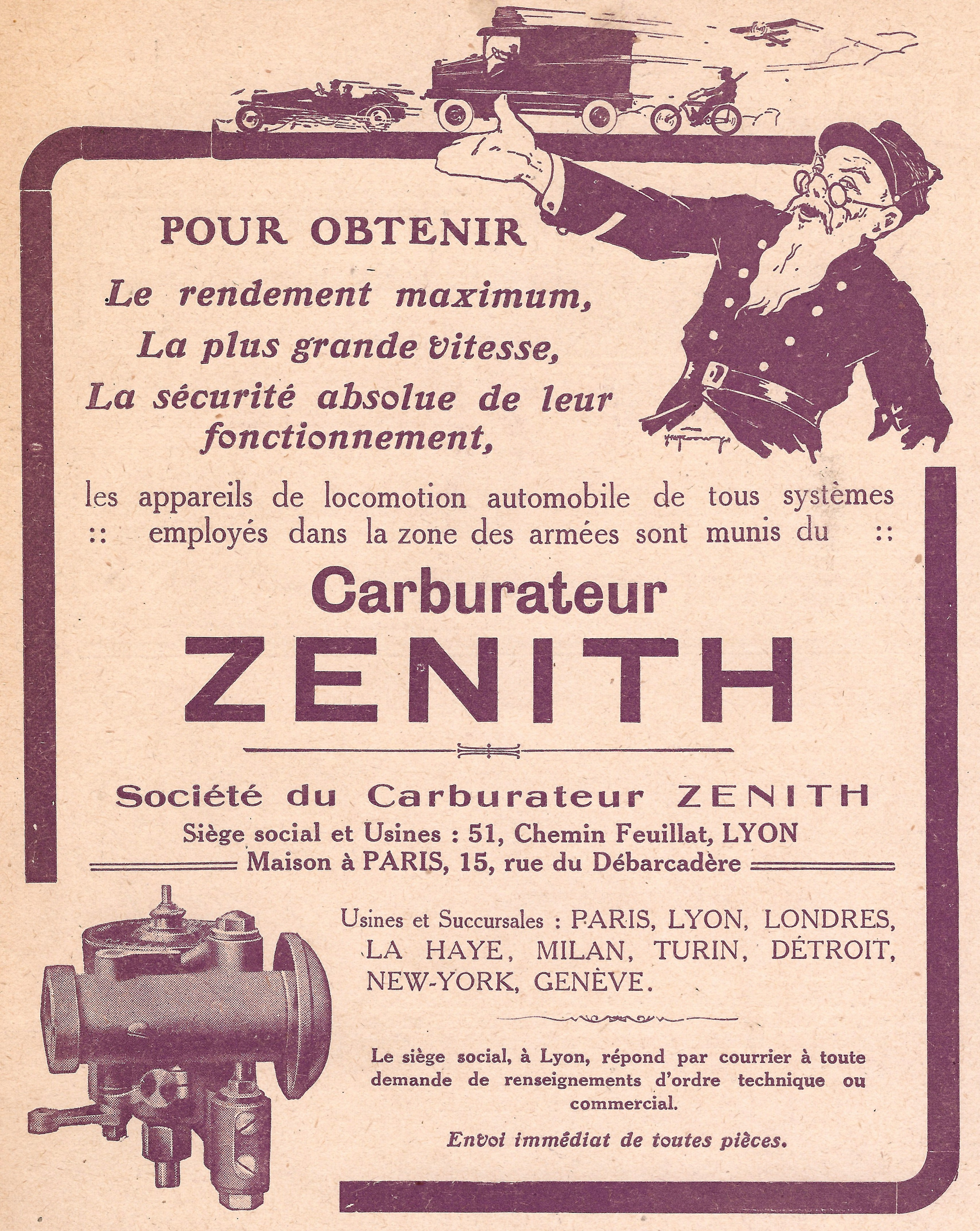
Zénith advertising in L'Illustration, 2 February 1918.

World War I led Zénith to diversification, as it started producing carburettors for airplanes and military vehicles. In the US, Zenith carbs were among those fitted to the Liberty L-12 aero engine. The increasing military demand led to production increase, up to a point where the factory size was not large enough and Zénith had to ask Rochet-Schneider to lend them more real estate. The Lyon factory grew up to occupy 25,000 square metres (6.2 acres), with the facade length reaching 350 metres (380 yd).

War touched every department of the company. It had started advertising in 1913, with the creation of a humorous character, "Professeur Zénith", teaching the virtues of the Zénith carburettors. While retaining his trademark glasses and long beard, the prof. sports a French Army military uniform on 1914–1918 advertising material.

=== Between the Wars ===
Diversification went on during the Interwar period. Zénith went on to make various carburation accessories, such as fuel filters, air filters or preheaters. Their industrial policy turned into success, as Zénith products went on to be offered by the main auto makers of the time, both French and foreign. As an example, at the 1924 Lyon Auto show, half the cars exposed were fitted with Zenith carburettors, while the rest had theirs made by 19 different manufacturers. During the year 1928, 100,000 carburettors were manufactured monthly by the sole Lyon factory, with similar figures for the Detroit plant. The same year, the entire Ford range was fitted with Zenith carburettors.

Advertising evolved, and prof. Zénith was dropped in 1920. Roaring Twenties Zénith adverts tried to present the carburettor as a key ingredient to the motorist's pleasure, while showing driving ladies, holidays, and even stars such as Hollywood actress Pearl White.

Research and development went on, continually trying to improve engine efficiency. In 1921, Zénith introduced a "triple diffuser" carburettor, aiming to improve the fuel/air mixture homogeneity and thus fuel economy. Based on three concentric air diffusers, it brutally accelerated the air stream, thus allowing for a very thin fuel vaporization, and finally its nearly total combustion. Unfortunately, this implied an important carburettor size, plus high production costs, which led to the triple diffuser being abandoned after a few years. The 1929 type U carburettor, on the other hand, was a success. It allowed for true synchronization between the accelerator and engine speed. The following year saw the introduction of the inverted carburettor, which allowed for a 10% increase in power for the same fuel consumption, as well as improved response, through positioning the air intake on top of the carburettor instead of at its base. 1932 saw the introduction of choke valves on Zénith products, one year after their competitor Solex.

By 1934, Société du carburateur Zénith had been hit by the effects of the Great Depression. As carburettors became increasingly complex, research became costly, so they reached an agreement with the American Bendix Corporation, under the terms of which they would put in common their laboratories and experience. This led to the introduction of Zenith-Stromberg carburettors in 1935, as well as Bendix-Stromberg carburetors.

=== World War II and after ===
If World War I had been good for Zénith, such was not the case of World War II. During the German military occupation, they had to make do with previous designs, and went on to manufacture kits allowing the French to use the fuels they were allowed by the Germans, namely ethanol, acetylene and gasogene. Normal operations resumed in 1946.

Operations continued during the 1950s and 1960s, even though main shareholder Rochet-Schneider was taken over by Berliet in 1959. In 1963, the Lyon factory was sold to Berliet as well, and carburettor production was moved to subsidiary Société Troyenne des Application Mécaniques (Troyan company for mechanical applications) in Troyes. In 1970, all Zénith automotive activities were taken over by the former German licensee, DVG (Deutsche Vergaser Gesellschaft, German carburettor company; later known as Pierburg, which became a Rheinmetall Automotive subsidiary). As they already owned Solex, DVG merged both companies under the name SEDEC (Société européenne de carburation, European carburation company). Aero production remained independent as Zénith Aéronautique, which established a factory in Roche-la-Molière, Loire in 1971. That last remnant of Zénith was taken over by Intertechnique in 1986, which in turn was taken over by Zodiac Aerospace, itself later a subsidiary of Safran Aircraft Engines.

== Applications ==
During the 20th century, carburettors manufactured by Société du carburateur Zénith and its subsidiaries were fitted to many vehicles. Among others:

- Citroën DS
- Zénith 28 IF on Renault Dauphine, then Renault 4
- Zénith 32 IF on Renault 6 and 12, then Renault 5, 18, Fuego and Trafic
- Zénith 35/40 INAT on Peugeot 504 and 505

== See also ==
- Zenith Carburettor Company (British)

== Appendices ==
=== External links ===
- "ZÉNITH : le carburateur du siècle" [ZENITH: the carburettor of the century] (PDF). fondationberliet.org (in French). Fondation de l’automobile Marius Berliet. 29 April 2014.
- Visite de l'usine des carburateurs Zénith on YouTube, 1955 visit of the Lyon factory, by the Institut national de l'audiovisuel.
