= Otto Flugmaschinenfabrik =

German aircraft producer

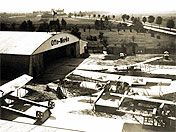
Otto Flugmaschinenfabrik in 1914, with Otto C.I aircraft parked outside the hangar

Gustav Otto Flugmaschinenfabrik was a pioneering German aircraft producer during the early part of the 20th century. Founded in 1910 by Gustav Otto in Bavaria, the firm was reorganized on 7 March 1916 into Bayerische Flugzeugwerke (BFW). In 1917, a Bavarian aircraft engine maker called Rapp Motorenwerke changed its name to Bayerische Motoren Werke GmbH (BMW). That company transferred its engine-production assets and the BMW name in 1922 to Bayerische Flugzeugwerke, which was then renamed to Bayerische Motoren Werke AG and subsequently evolved into the automotive and motorcycle manufacturer that is now known as BMW.

== History ==
Biplane produced by Gustav Otto Flugmaschinenfabrik in 1914

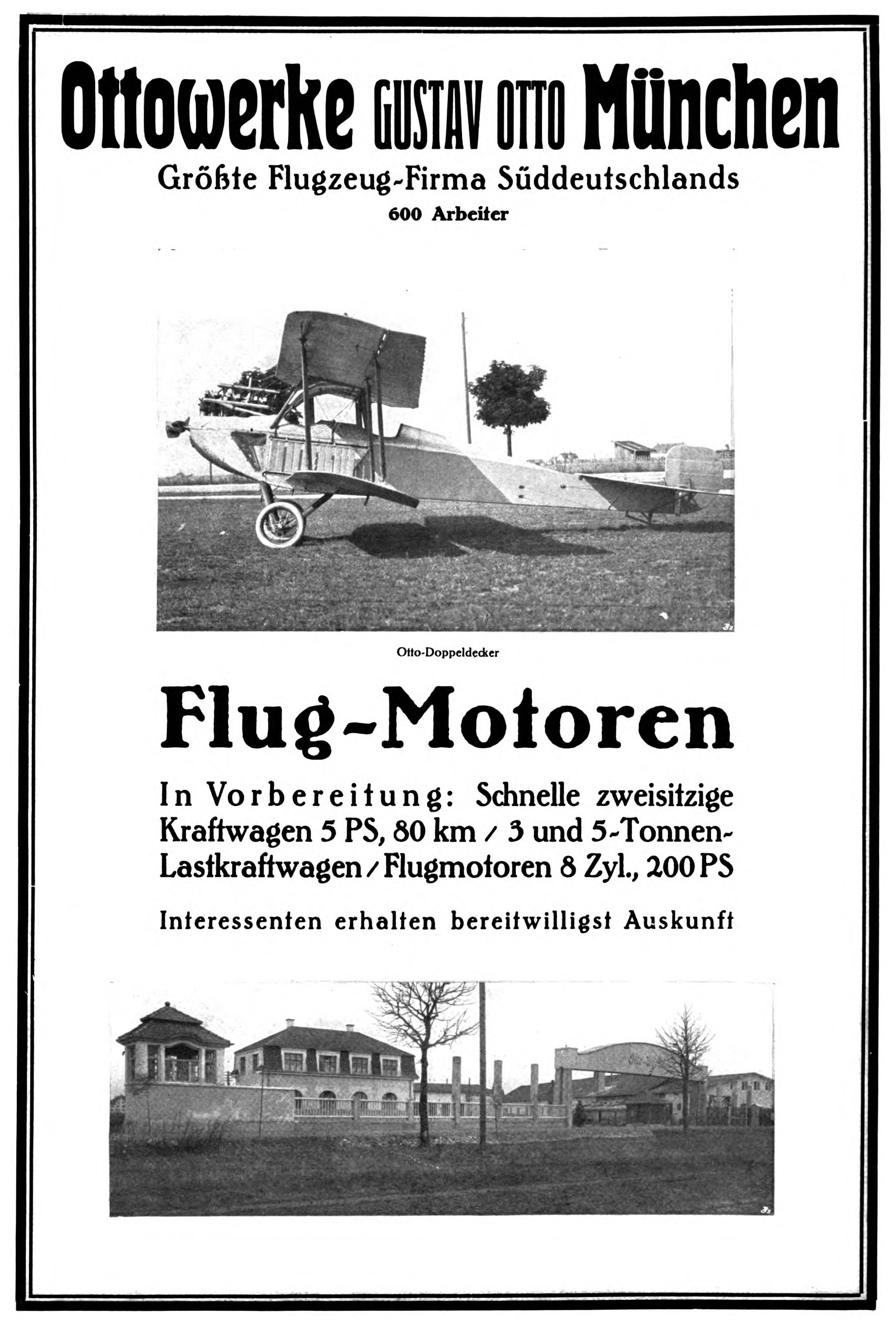
Ottowerke Gustav Otto München advertisement in early 1916

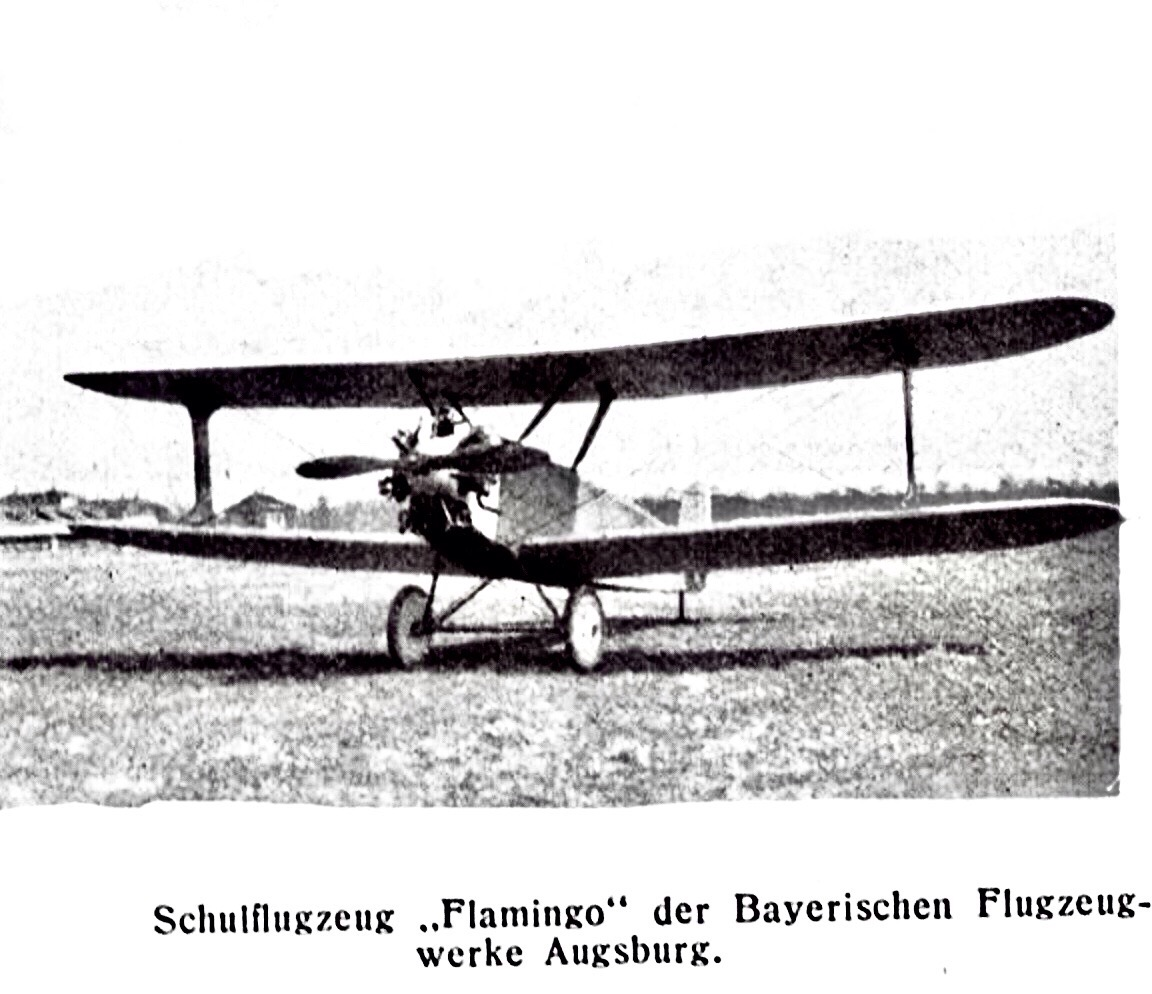
Bayerische Flugzeugwerke (BFW) Flamingo (1927) Siemens Motor 100 HP

In 1910, Gustav Otto founded the "Aeroplanbau Otto-Alberti" workshop at the Puchheim airfield near Munich in Bavaria, where Otto and a few others flew machines made of wood, wire and canvas which were powered by an engine. Through their passion for these flying machines, they helped transform aviation from a do-it-yourself hobby into a genuine industry that became vital to the military, especially after the breakout of World War I. Ernst Udet, the second-highest scoring German flying ace of World War I (second only to the Red Baron), earned his pilot's license from private training with Otto during this time.

In 1911, Otto moved the company and renamed it "Gustav Otto Flugmaschinenfabrik". The official entry appears as No. 14/364: "Gustav Otto in Munich, flying machine factory, office at 72 Karlstrasse." Shortly afterwards, Otto moved the workshop from its original location at 37 Gabelsberger Strasse to new premises at 135 Schleissheimer Strasse.

In 1914, construction started on a new factory at 76 Neulerchenfeldstrasse (later Lerchenauer Straße). Otto moved the company to the new factory on Lerchenauer Strasse, just east of the Oberwiesenfeld troop maneuver area in the Milbertshofen district of Munich, later to become the site of Munich's first airport. He wanted to be closer to the German government's procurement process for military sale.

In 1915, the company was again renamed to "Otto Werke, Gustav Otto, München". Shortly thereafter, Otto established another company named AGO Flugzeugwerke at Berlin's Johannisthal Air Field.

While the designs by Otto were initially successful, he was continually experiencing problems related to cost-effective production, as well as generating profits. At the start of the war, Otto Werke was supplying the German Air Force, but as the war progressed, so did production problems. Eventually, the government agencies urged the company to nationalize its production.

The stress of wartime and ongoing financial problems with the company proved too great a burden for Otto, who suffered health issues. At the insistence of the Bavarian and Prussian War Ministries (and in particular the Inspectors of the Engineering Corps), the unprofitable aircraft manufacturer was taken over by the German government, and Otto was forced to resign from his company. A consortium of banks took over the assets of the company.

Otto Werke was reorganized into Bayerische Flugzeugwerke AG on 7 March 1916, and was later reconstituted as Messerschmitt AG on 11 July 1938. In the summer of 1916, thirteen Otto C.I twin-boom aircraft were delivered to the Bulgarian Air Force.

== See also ==
- History of BMW
- Messerschmitt
