= Karl Rapp =

German engineer

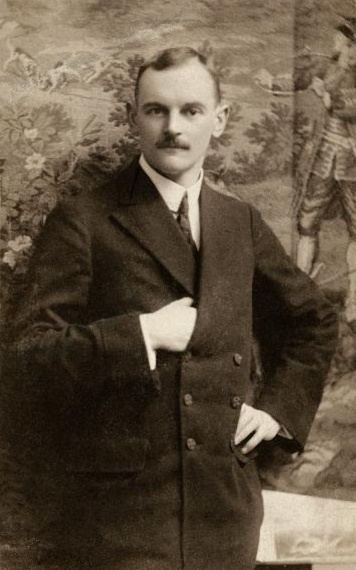
- Karl Rapp in 1911
- Born: Karl Friedrich Rapp; 24 September 1882; Ehingen, German Empire
- Died: 26 May 1962 (aged 79); Locarno, Switzerland
- Occupation: Mechanical engineering
- Employer: Rapp Motorenwerke
- Known for: Founding of Rapp Motorenwerke

Karl Friedrich Rapp (24 September 1882 – 26 May 1962) was a German founder and owner of the Rapp Motorenwerke GmbH in Munich. In time, this company became BMW AG. He is acknowledged by BMW AG as an indirect founder of the company.

== Early life ==
Little is known of Karl Rapp's childhood and adolescent years. However, it is known that Rapp learned the engineering profession and was employed by Züp automotive company from approx. 1908 to 1911. It is believed he was active as a technical designer with Daimler-Motoren-Gesellschaft until 1912. Rapp left the Daimler-Motoren-Gesellschaft to head a branch of Flugwerk Deutschland GmbH.

== Aircraft engine manufacturing ==
Flugwerk Deutschland GmbH probably transferred its headquarters from Gelsenkirchen-Rotthausen to Brand near Aachen. The articles of association were ratified on 15 February 1912, and the entry in the Aachen Commercial Register was effected on 5 March 1912. The object of the business was the manufacture and sale of aircraft, the construction and sale of machinery and equipment in the areas of aircraft engineering, and the operation of airfields and aerodromes. On 20 May 1913, a branch was set up for aero-engine production at Schleissheimer Straße 288 (near the first airport on the Oberwiesenfeld) in Munich-Milbertshofen, and Karl Rapp and Joseph Wirth were given power of attorney in Munich. Rapp, working as an engineer and operations manager for the company, engaged in the construction of several biplanes and a monoplane. Rapp also designed aero engines, one of which was the FD 1416 aero engine. The company participated in the General Air Show in Berlin in 1912. However, the company was dissolved by a resolution of the shareholders on 16 April 1913, and Joseph Wirth was appointed as sole liquidator. After the liquidation process had been brought to an end, the company was wound up on 8 August 1916.

== Rapp Motorenwerke - the BMW foundation ==
Karl Rapp and Julius Auspitzer founded Karl Rapp Motorenwerke GmbH with a capital stock of RM 200,000 on 29 April 1913 on the site of Flugwerke Deutschland (after the company went into liquidation). General Consul Auspitzer was the company's sole shareholder, with the operational side of the company managed by Karl Rapp. The idea was for the new company to build and sell "engines of all types, in particular, internal combustion engines for aircraft and motor vehicles", in addition to building an engine for the 2nd Kaiser's Trophy Competition (but it was not ready in time). The company expanded rapidly and employed 370 coworkers by 1915. Several aircraft prototypes were designed at Rapp Motorenwerke, but success eluded all these prototypes because of weaknesses in the design. At the beginning of the First World War, the company was one of the key Bavarian companies for the war effort, and appeared to have gained a certain reputation, despite the fact that none of the designs and developments achieved any real success. Although the Prussian Army Administration rejected delivery of Rapp engines as unsuitable, the Bavarian Army Administration and the Imperial Naval Office of the Imperial Austro-Hungarian Army Administration continued to order Rapp engines licensed through Austro-Daimler. On behalf of the Austrian War Ministry, Franz Josef Popp supervised the handling of the order in Munich.

The decision by the Prussian Army Administration to order 600 units of the innovative high-altitude aero-engine (project name "BBE"), originated by the designer Max Friz, entailed reorganising the legal structure of the company. The unsuccessful managing director and shareholder Karl Rapp resigned from the company around that time, most likely due to ill health. In this connection, Rapp-Motorenwerke was renamed Bayerische Motoren Werke GmbH. On 4 October 1917, Franz Josef Popp was appointed Managing Director of the company. The new company took over the employees and manufacturing facilities. Until the end of the war, aero-engines remained the company's only product. The BBE aero-engine was a big success under the designation BMW IIIa.

== Later life ==

After Rapp left the company (it was immediately renamed BMW), he became chief engineer and head of the Aeroengine Department of the L.A. Riedlinger Machine Factory, where he was probably employed until October 1923.

Rapp lived in Switzerland from 1934, running a small observatory making solar observations.

Karl Friedrich Rapp died in 1962 in Locarno.

== See also ==
- History of BMW
