= Argus 140/150 hp 4-cylinder =

1910s German piston aircraft engine

Argus 140/150 hp
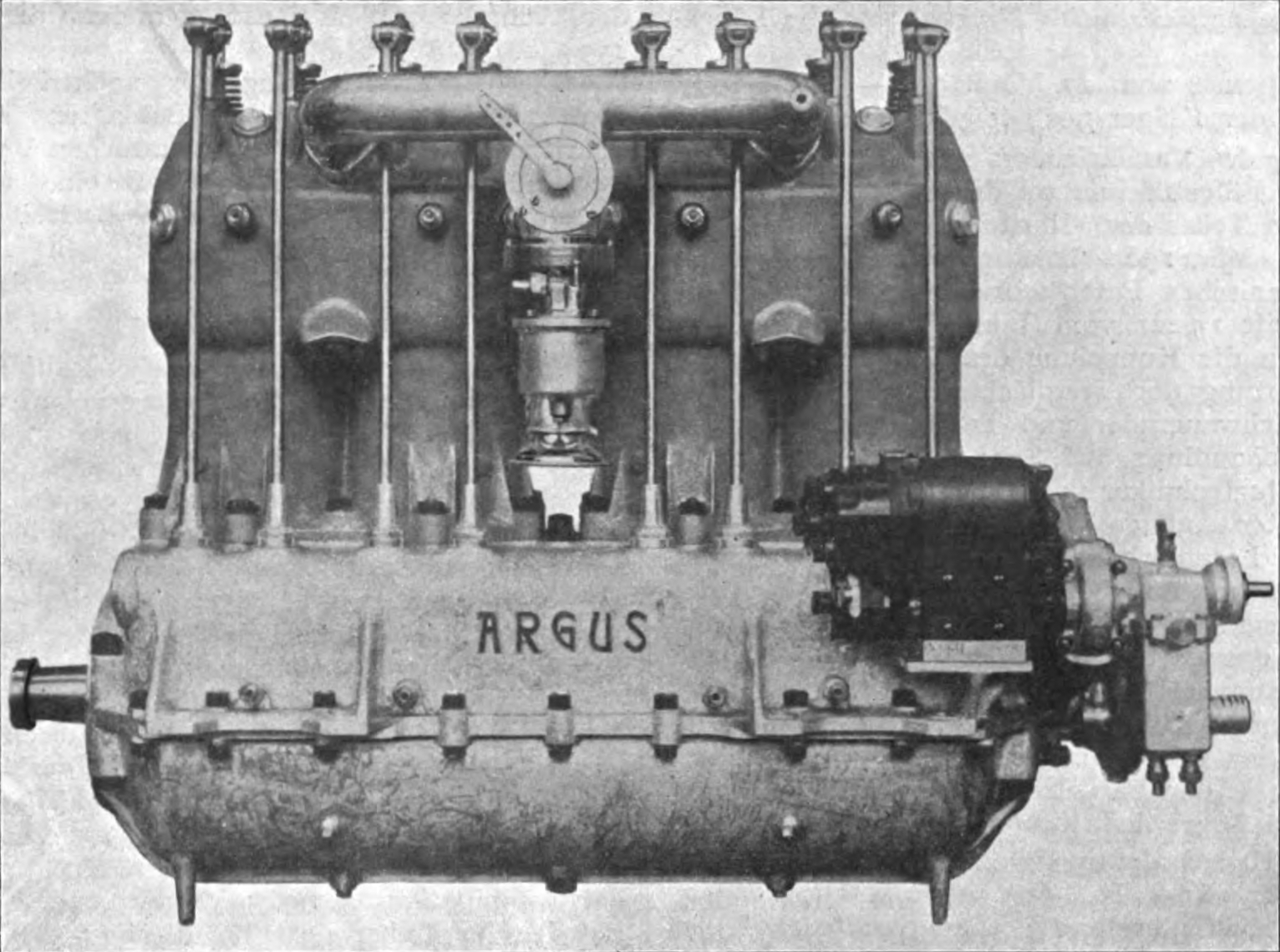
- Argus 140/150 hp four-cylinder aircraft engine, intake side
- Type: Piston inline aero engine
- National origin: Germany
- Manufacturer: Argus Motoren
- First run: c.1911
- Developed from: Argus As I

The Argus 140/150 hp aircraft engine from 1911, also known as Argus Type IV (not As IV), was a four-cylinder, water-cooled inline engine built by the German Argus Motoren company.

== Design and development ==
The Argus 140/150 hp first can be found in a 1911 brochure of the Automobil und Aviatik AG. In April 1912 it was also presented at the "ALA" (Allgemeine Luftfahrzeug-Ausstellung) exhibition in Berlin.

It had a bore and stroke of 155 mm × 165 mm (6.1 in × 6.5 in) and was rated 140–150 hp (100–110 kW) at 1,250–1,300 rpm.

The general design of the engine was carried over from the preceding four-cylinder Argus engines, such as the 100 hp (75 kW) Argus As I.

The engine cylinders were of cast iron, cast in pairs of two cylinders, with the cooling jackets integral in the casting. There were two overhead valves per cylinder, which were operated via pushrods and rocker arms from the camshaft on the left side of the engine. The intake valves were oriented to the center of each cylinder pair, and their intake ducts were conjoined within the casting into a single external port facing to the left side of the engine. The intake manifold was made of cast aluminum and a single Cudell-G.A.-carburettor was installed.

The crankcase was made of aluminum and cast in separate upper and lower half parts, with the upper half having four mounting arms cast into it. Each cylinder pair was fixated to the crankcase by ten bolts. The crankshaft was supported by two outer ball bearings and one intermediate plain bearing.

The camshaft was driven from the crankshaft by spur gears at the control end, with generally all gears on the control end having been encapsulated. The engine had two spark plugs per cylinder and a single Bosch-magneto, which was driven from the camshaft spur gear. Lubrication was done by an oil pump mounted on the control end, directly driven by the camshaft. The oil was recirculated from the oil sump and sprayed onto the connecting rod ends, from where it was distributed further. Also, a centrifugal water pump was mounted directly to the crankshaft at the control end.

In 1912, the engine has also been submitted to the Kaiserpreis contest for aviation engines, where it was rated down to the maximum allowed 115 hp (86 kW) by throttling it to 1,100 rpm. The engine suffered a piston fracture caused by a torn off valve disk. Since the replacement engine was not available, and the engine according to Argus Motoren was at disadvantage due to its power, it was retracted from the competition.

== Specifications ==
Data from Huth

=== General characteristics ===
- Type: four-cylinder, water-cooled inline piston engine
- Bore: 155 mm (6.1 in)
- Stroke: 165 mm (6.5 in)
- Displacement: 12.45 L (760 cu in)
- Length: 1,220 mm (48 in)
- Width: 495 mm (19.5 in)
- Height: 726 mm (28.6 in)
- Dry weight: 190 kg (419 lb)

=== Components ===
- Valvetrain: Cam-in-block, OHV
- Cooling system: Water-cooled

=== Performance ===
- Power output: 140 hp (100 kW) at 1,250 rpm

== See also ==
Related development

- Argus As I

Related lists

- List of aircraft engines
