= Argus 70 hp =

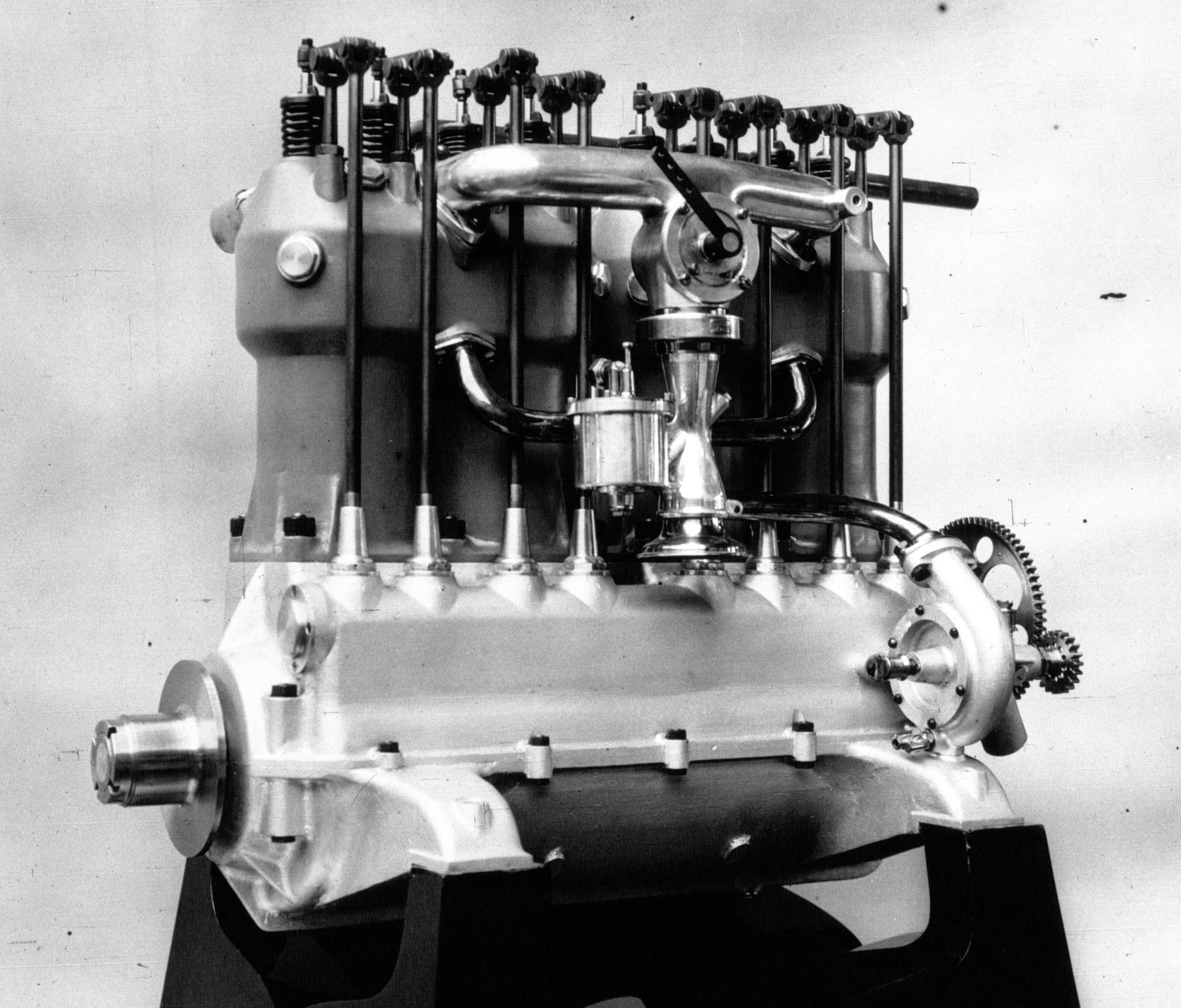
- Argus (Aviatic-Rossel) 70 hp four-cylinder aircraft engine, intake side, 1911
- Type: Piston inline aero engine
- National origin: Germany
- Manufacturer: Argus Motoren
- First run: c.1911
- Developed from: Argus 50 hp
- Developed into: Argus As I

The Argus 70 hp aircraft engine, aka Argus Type I (in common with the Argus 50 hp and not As I) from 1911 was a four-cylinder, water cooled inline engine built by the German Argus Motoren company. The engine also was license produced in France by Automobiles Rossel and sold in France under the brand names 'Aviatik' and 'Aviatic-Rossel' by Louis Clément, the local sales representative of the Automobil und Aviatik AG.

== Design and development ==
The Argus 70 hp engine had a bore and stroke of 124 mm × 130 mm (4.9 in × 5.1 in) and was rated 70 hp (52 kW) at 1,250 rpm. The engine design evolved from the earlier Argus 50 hp engines with the same bore and stroke, with the main change being the use of overhead valves instead of side valves. The engine can already be found in a 1911 brochure of the Automobil und Aviatik AG.

The engine cylinders were of cast iron, cast in pairs of two cylinders, with the cooling jackets integral in the casting. There were two overhead valves per cylinder, which were operated via pushrods and rocker arms from the camshaft on the left side of the engine. The intake valves were oriented to the center of each cylinder pair, and their intake ducts were conjoined within the casting into a single external port facing to the left side of the engine. The intake manifold was made of cast aluminum and a single Cudell-G.A.-carburettor was installed.

The crankcase was made of aluminum and cast in separate upper and lower half parts, with the lower half having four mounting arms cast into it. Each cylinder pair was fixated to the crankcase by six bolts. The crankshaft was supported by two outer ball bearings and one intermediate plain bearing.

The camshaft was driven from the crankshaft by spur gears at the control end. The engine had one or two spark plugs per cylinder and a single Bosch-magneto located at the control side of the engine, driven from the crankshaft via an intermediate spur gear. There was no oil pump installed and the lubrication was done solely by splash. The coolant was circulated by a centrifugal water pump which was installed on the carburettor side and driven from the camshaft gear.

In October 1911 the engine has been evaluated in a French contest for aviation engines, where it produced on average 72.2 hp (53.8 kW) at 1,248 rpm. In 1912 the engine also competed the Kaiserpreis aircraft engine contest, where it produced on average 72 hp (54 kW) at 1,342 rpm.

== Applications ==
- Friedrichshafen FF.4
- Friedrichshafen FF.8

== Specifications ==
Data from Huth

=== General characteristics ===
- Type: four-cylinder, water-cooled in-line piston engine
- Bore: 124 mm (4.9 in)
- Stroke: 130 mm (5.1 in)
- Displacement: 6.28 L (383 cu in)
- Dry weight: 120 kg (265 lb)

=== Components ===
- Valvetrain: Cam-in-block, OHV
- Cooling system: Water-cooled

=== Performance ===
- Power output: 70 hp (52 kW) at 1,250 rpm

== See also ==
Related development

- Argus 50 hp
- Argus As I

Related lists

- List of aircraft engines
