= Argus 50 hp =

1900s German piston aircraft engine

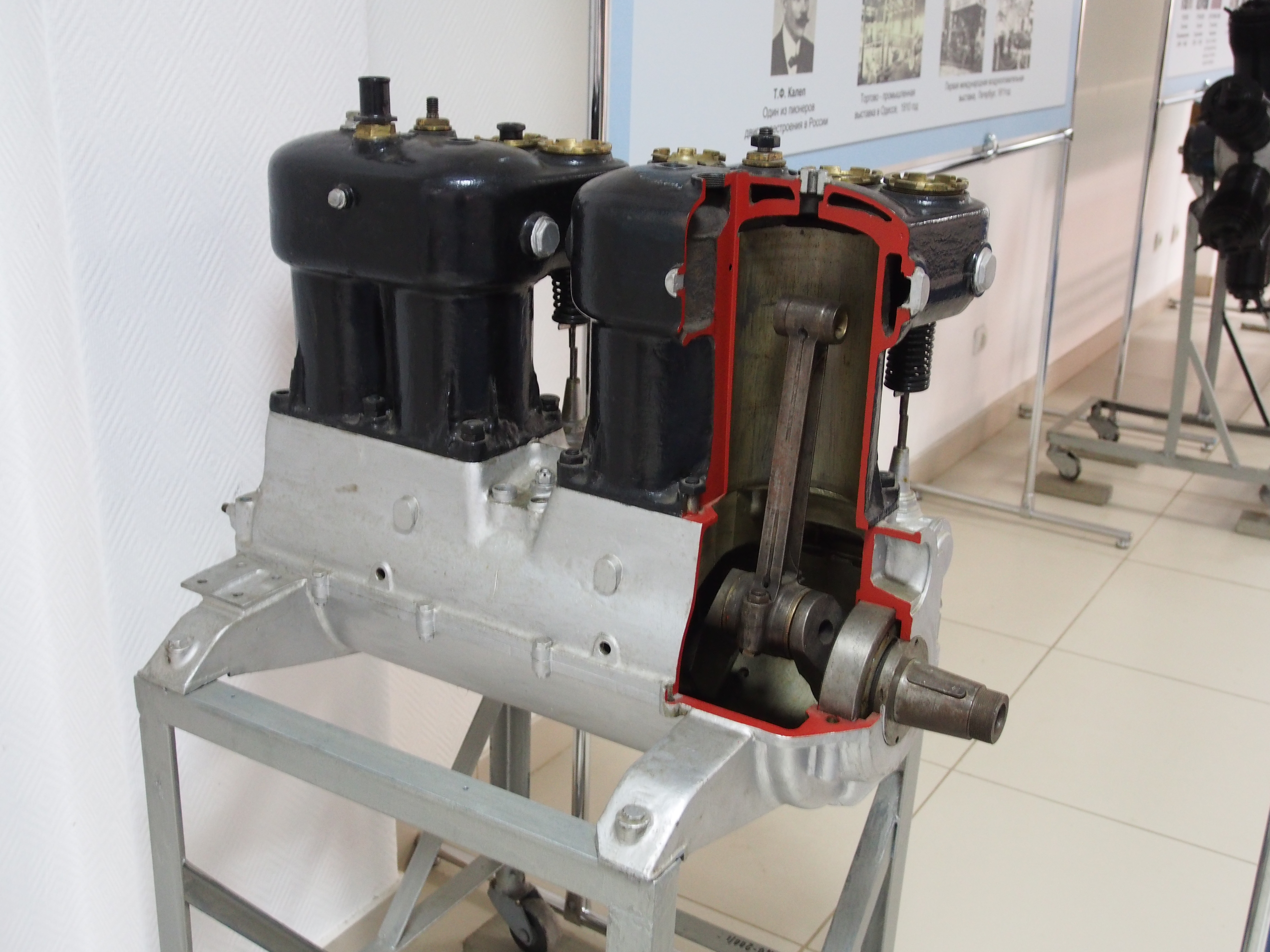
- Argus 50 hp side valve aircraft engine
- Type: Piston inline aero engine
- National origin: Germany
- Manufacturer: Argus Motoren
- First run: c.1909
- Developed into: Argus 70 hp

The Argus 50 hp aircraft engine, from 1909 was a four-cylinder, water cooled inline engine built by the German Argus Motoren company.

== Design and development ==
The Argus 50 hp aircraft engine was developed by Argus Motoren around 1909 based upon their earlier balloon- and boat-engines.

It had a bore of 124 mm (4.88 in) and a stroke of 130 mm (5.12 in) and produced about 45–55 hp (34–41 kW) at 1200–1300 rpm and was produced in two variants, with the valves and camshaft on the right or on the left side respectively.

The engine cylinders were of cast iron, cast in pairs of two cylinders, with the cooling jackets integral in the casting. There were two side valves per cylinder, which were operated from the camshaft, which was located on one side of the engine block and driven from the crankshaft by spur gears. The intake valves were oriented to the middle of each cylinder pair, and their intake ducts were conjoined within the casting into a single external port. All four cylinders were fed by a single Cudell-G.A.-carburettor.

The coolant was circulated by a centrifugal water pump which was installed on the carburettor side and driven from the camshaft gear. A single spark plug per cylinder was mounted above the inlet valve, with the magneto located at the control side of the engine, driven from the crankshaft via an intermediate spur gear. There was no oil pump installed and the lubrication was done solely by splash.

== Applications ==
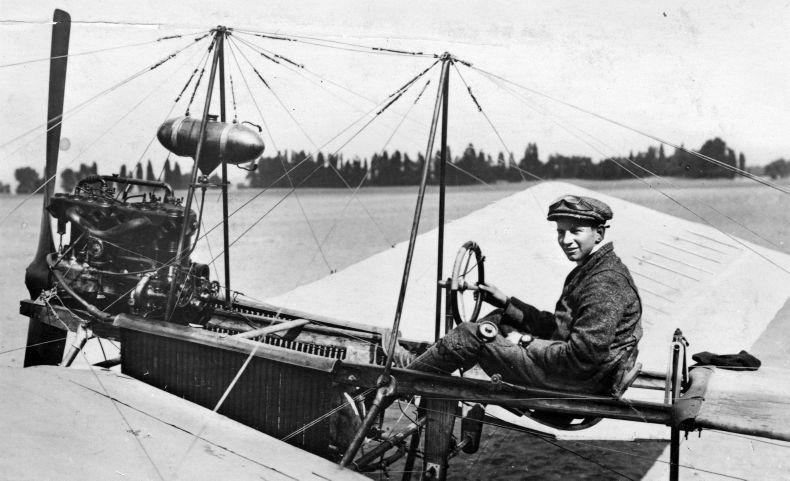
Anthony Fokker in his first aircraft 'Spin', featuring an Argus 50 hp engine

- Fokker Spin 1910 (first and second version)
- Sikorsky S-5

== Specifications ==
Data from Z.F.M.

=== General characteristics ===
- Type: four-cylinder, water-cooled in-line piston engine
- Bore: 124 mm (4.88 in)
- Stroke: 130 mm (5.12 in)
- Dry weight: 129 kg (284 lb)

=== Components ===
- Valvetrain: Cam-in-block, Sidevalves
- Cooling system: Water-cooled

=== Performance ===
- Power output: 55 hp (41 kW) at 1,300 rpm

== See also ==
Related development

- Argus 70 hp

Related lists

- List of aircraft engines
