= Moskvitch 400-420 =

Soviet car model (1947–1956)

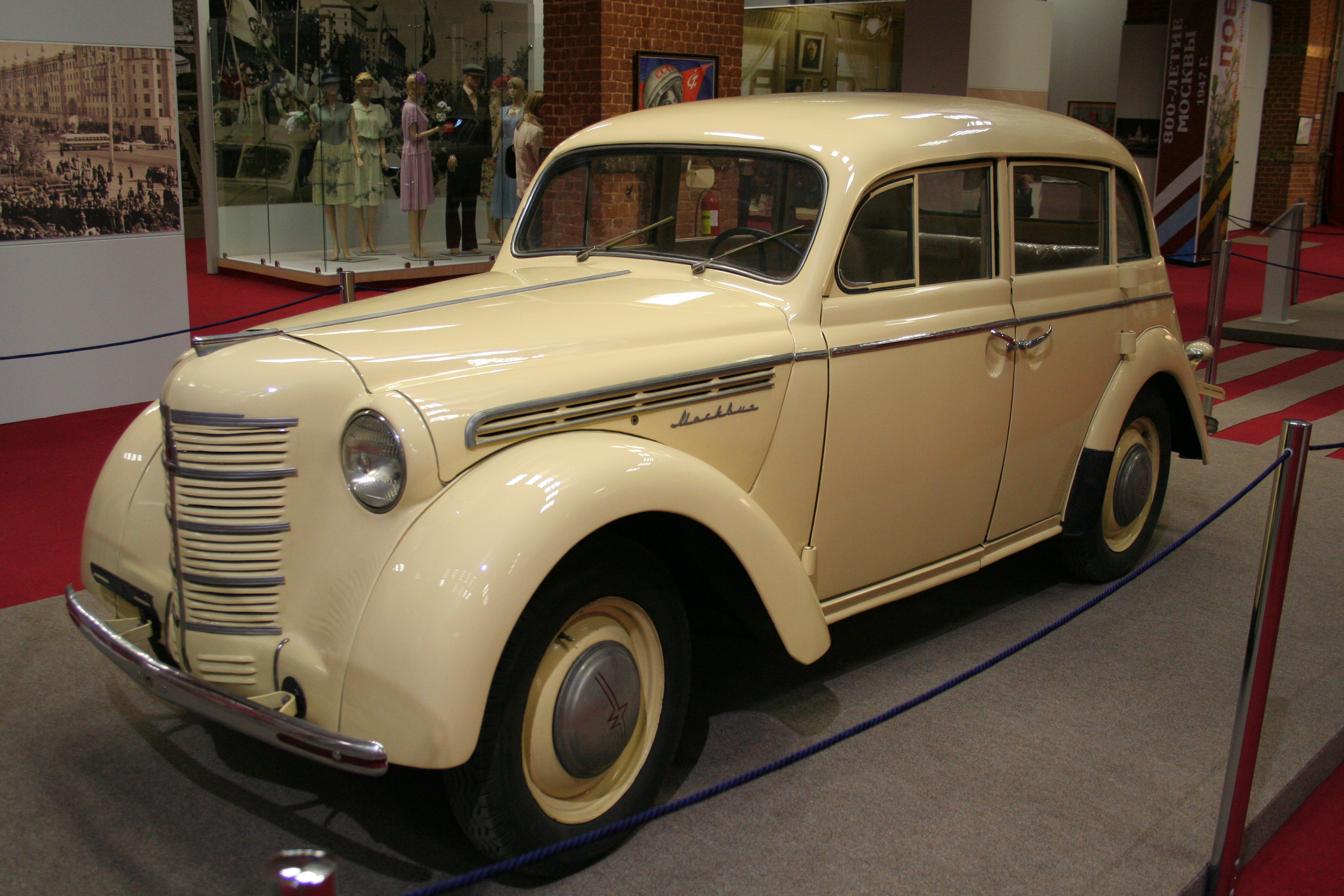

Overview
- Manufacturer: Moskvitch
- Production: 1947–1956

Body and chassis
- Body style: 4-door sedan; convertible; station wagon
- Layout: FR layout
- Related: Opel Kadett K38

Powertrain
- Engine: 1.1 L MZMA-400 I4
- Transmission: 3-speed manual

Chronology
- Successor: Moskvitch 402

The Moskvitch 400-420 is a car that was introduced in 1947 by the Soviet manufacturer Moskvitch.

== Background ==
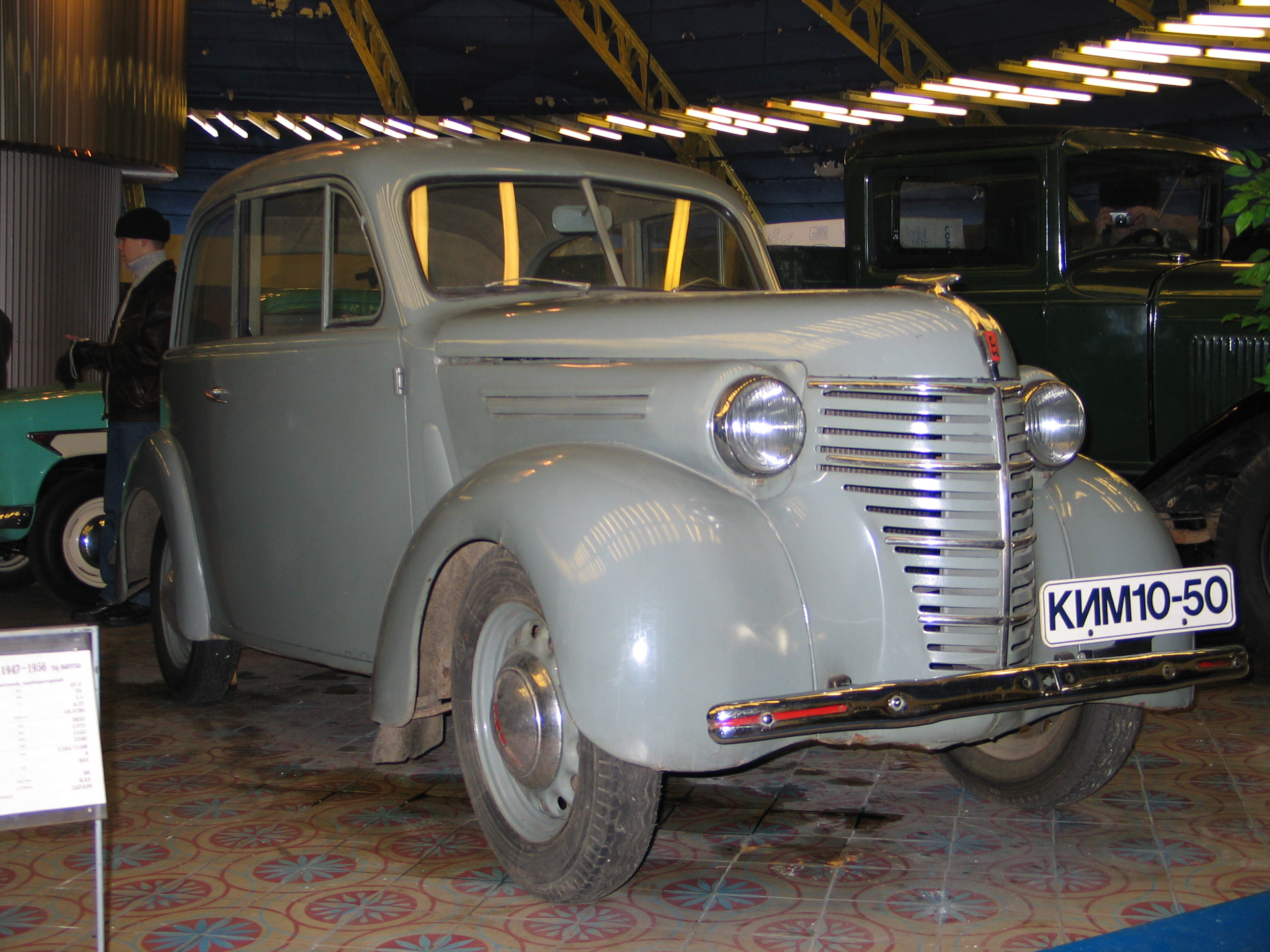
KIM-10-50

In 1940 and 1941 500 units of the KIM-10-50, the first Soviet compact car, were produced. It was inspired by the similar-sized four-door Ford Prefect and, despite its low price, equipped with such features as a mechanical clock and indicators of the level of oil and the temperature of water in the radiator. However, national priorities changed with the German invasion in summer 1941, and production of the car was halted and not resumed after the war.

At war's end, the Soviet Union deemed the plans and tooling for the 1939 Opel Kadett K38 to be part of the war reparations package, since the tooling in the Rüsselsheim factory was largely intact; residents dismantled the Kadett production tooling and loaded fifty-six freight cars bound for Moscow and the newly built "Stalin Factory" (ZIS). However, according to recent Russian sources, the Kadett plans and tooling were in fact not captured from the factory, because they did not survive there (and what survived was appropriate for producing a two-door model).

== Development ==
Development began in 1944, following a prewar plan to produce a domestically built car able to be used and maintained by citizens living outside major cities. The KIM factory was selected to build the car, with the prewar KIM-10-52 (not built due to the Second World War) as a basis, with production approved in May 1945 and prototypes intended to be ready in December. By the end of May, however, these plans had faltered.

It was Joseph Stalin who personally chose in June 1945 a four-door Opel Kadett to become the first mass-produced popular Soviet car, so plans and tooling of a four-door version had to be reconstructed with help of German engineers, who worked upon them in a Soviet occupation zone. The Soviet Union was not the only country to adopt the design at that time: the Kadett had impressed Louis Renault and heavily inspired his Renault Juvaquatre produced in 1937–1960.

== Moskvitch 400 ==
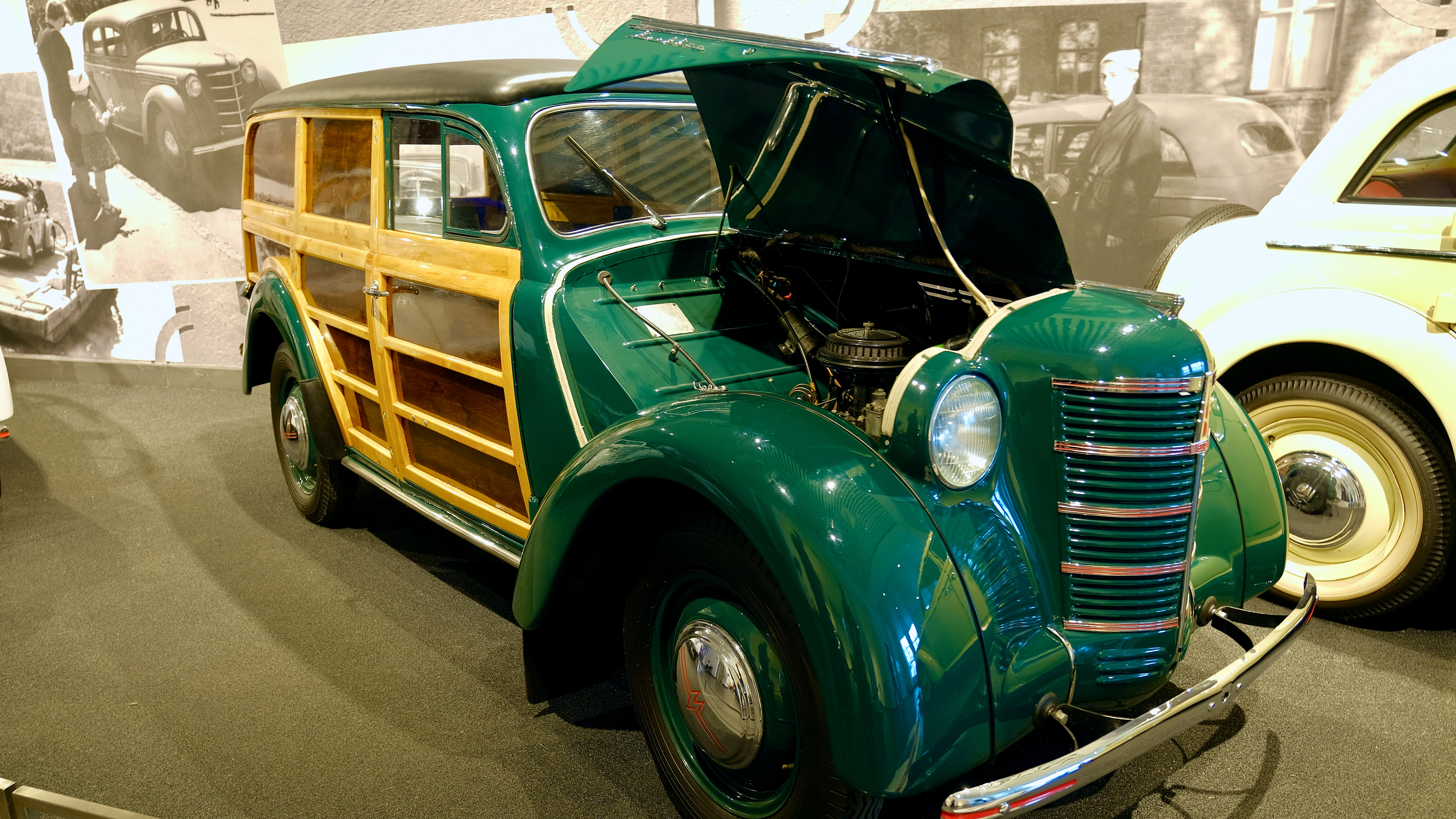
Moskvitch-400-422

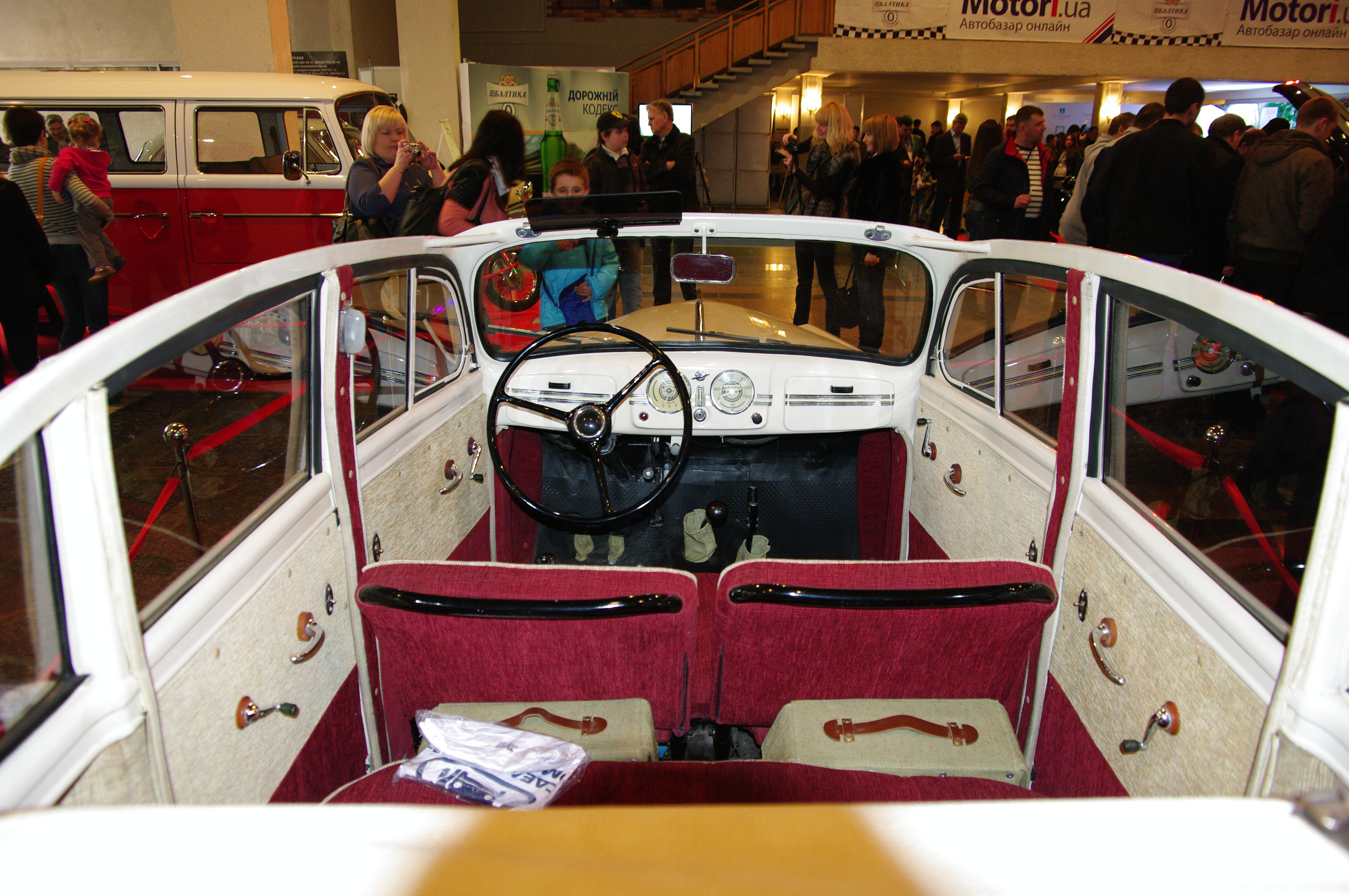
Moskvitch-400-420A interior

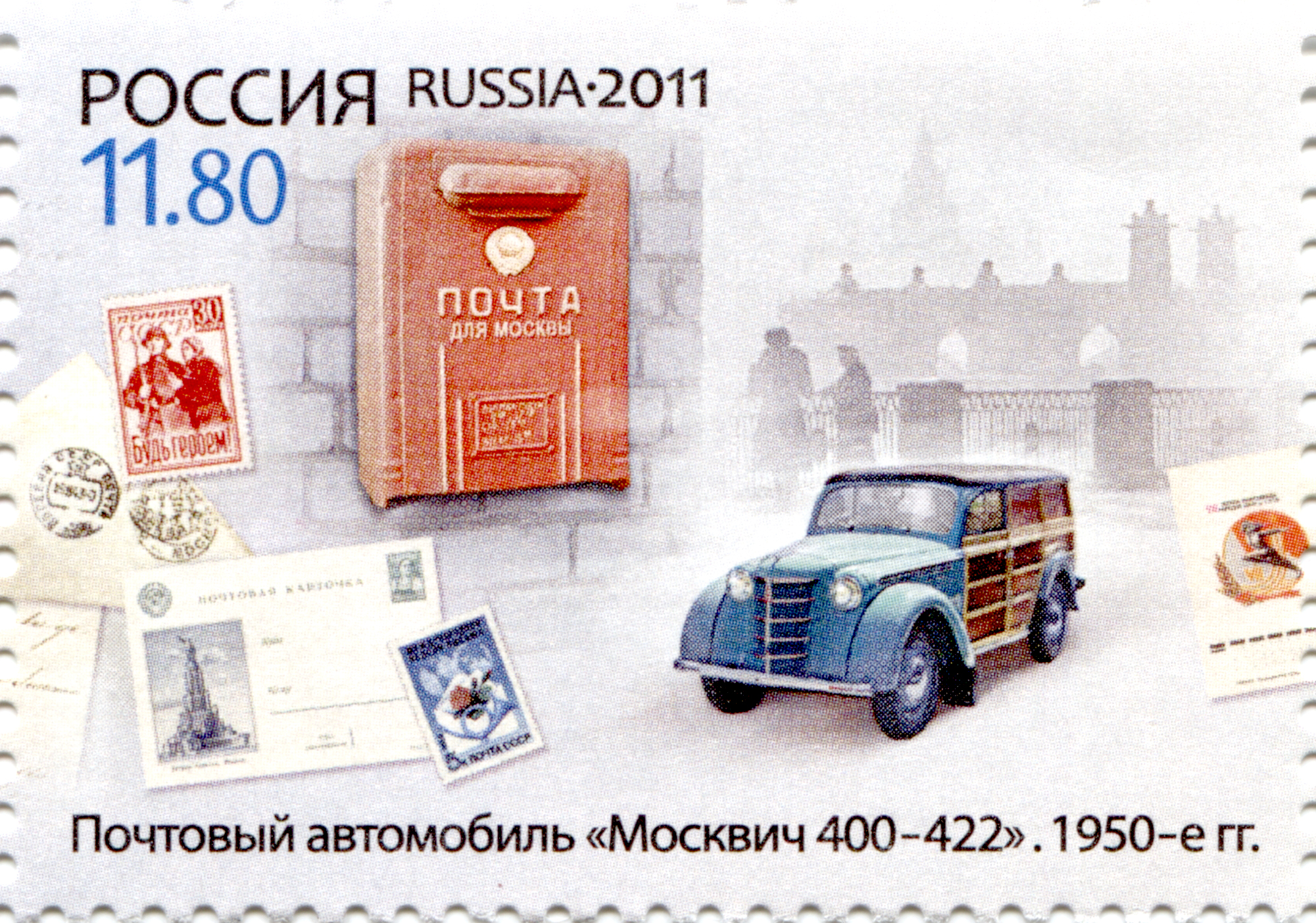
Postage stamp illustrating the Moskvitch 400-422, 1950

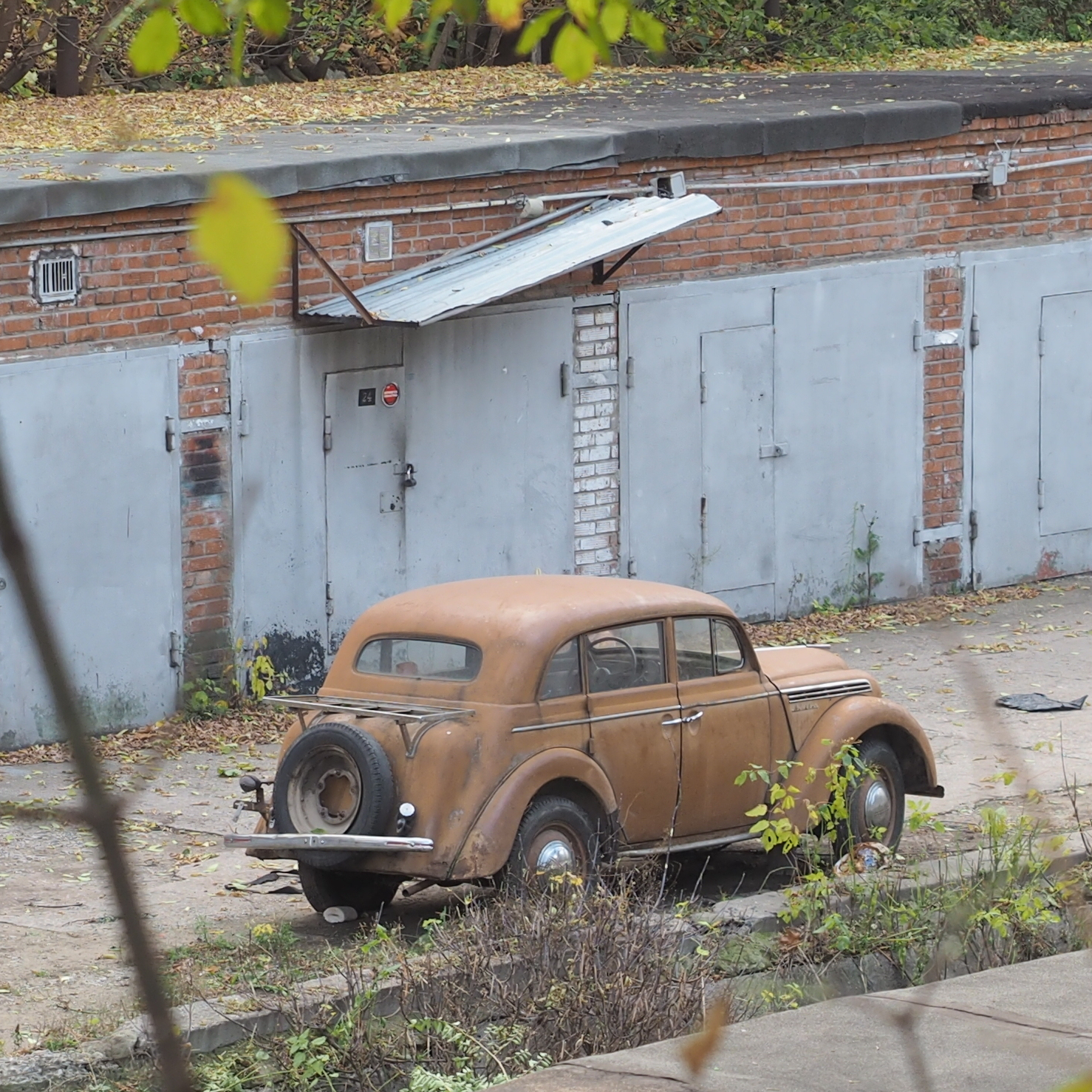
Rear view

After KIM was renamed MZMA (Moscovskiy Zavod Malolitrazhnyh Avtomobiley, Moscow Factory for Making Small Cars) in August 1945, the new car was ready for production before the end of 1946 (somewhat behind the planned June deadline): the first 400-420 was built 9 December, "400" meant a type of engine, and "420" the (saloon) body style. With unitized construction, independent front suspension, three-speed manual transmission. and hydraulic brakes, it was powered by a 23 hp (17 kW) 1,074 cc (65.5 cu in) inline four (with a compression ratio of 5.6:1). Acceleration 0–50 mph (0–80 km/h) took 55 seconds, and achieved 9 L/100 km (31 mpg_{‑imp}; 26 mpg_{‑US}) (the best of any Soviet car at that time). With a wheelbase of 2,340 mm (92 in)) and ground clearance of 200 mm (7.9 in)), it measured 3,855 mm (151.8 in) long overall 1,400 mm (55 in) wide, 1,550 mm (61 in) tall. Approved for mass production by the Soviet government on 28 April 1947, 1,501 were built the first year, with 4,808 for 1948 and 19,906 in 1949, the same year a mesh oil filter was introduced. In 1951, synchromesh was introduced on the top two gears, and the gear lever relocated to the steering column.

In 1948, a woodie van, the 400-422, with an 800 kg (1,800 lb) payload, went into production but the similar prototype 400-421 estate and a pick-up never did. The 400-420A cabriolet debuted in 1949.

The 400 went on sale in Belgium in October 1950, making it a very early Soviet automotive export product, priced at £349: below the Ford Prefect and Anglia, and well below the Morris Minor. Motor praised its engine's quietness, the calibre of its finish, and the quality of the ride.

The 100,000th Moskvich was built in October 1952.

Several prototypes were also built. In 1949, proposal for an improved 26 hp (19 kW) 401E-424E and a 33 hp (24 kW) 403E-424E saw only six examples built. Following this, in 1951, the factory produced the 403-424A coupé with a 35 hp (26 kW) four. The "stunning" 404 Sport of 1954 used a new, 58 hp (43 kW) overhead valve hemi engine.

== Moskvitch 401 ==
Moskvitch 401
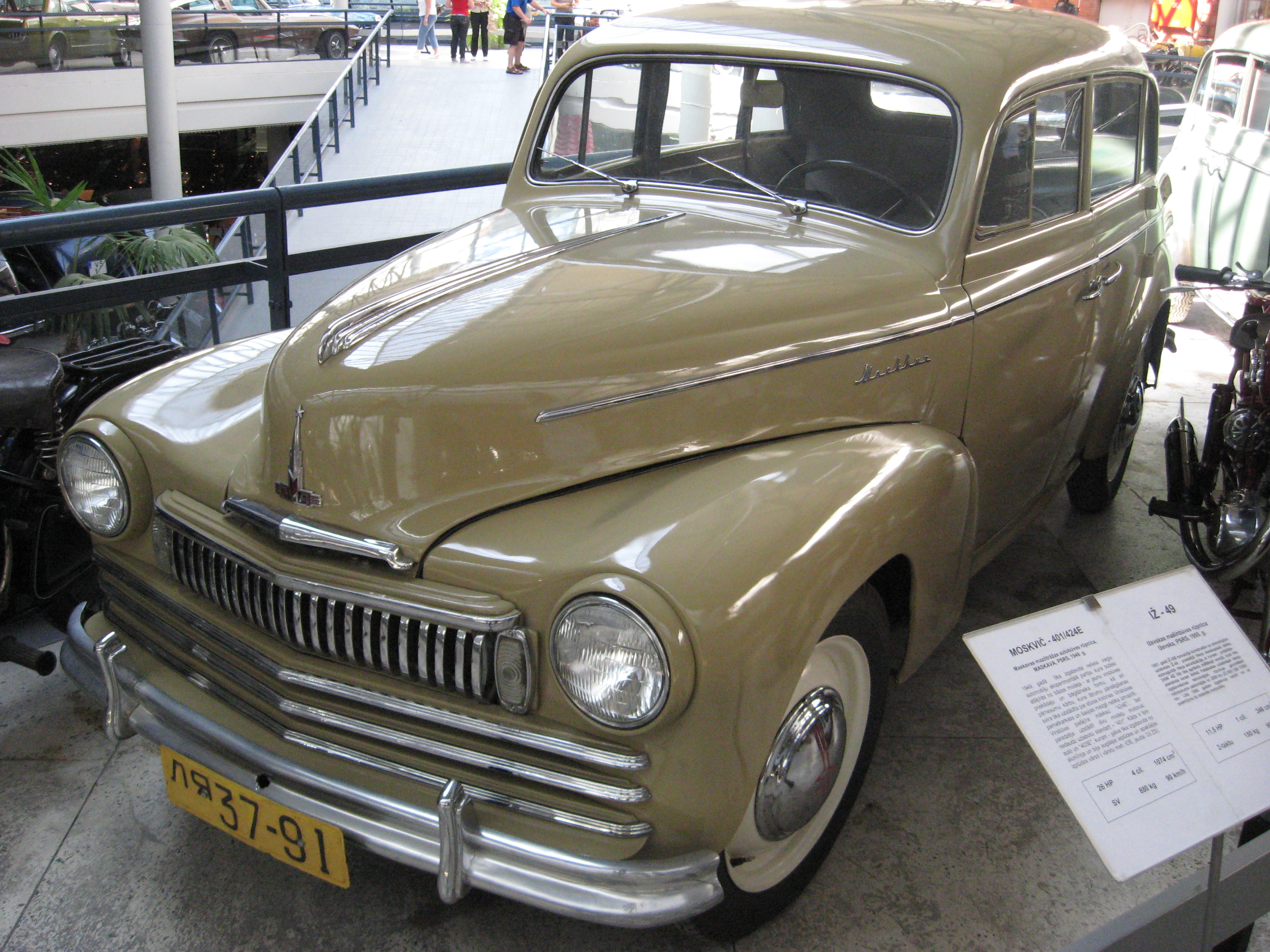
- 1949 Moskvich 401-424E

Overview
- Production: 1954–1956
- Assembly: Moscow

Powertrain
- Engine: 1.1 L MZMA-400 I4
- Transmission: 3-speed manual

Chronology
- Predecessor: Moskvitch 400-420
- Successor: Moskvitch 402

The Moskvitch 401 (full designation: Moskvitch 401-420) was introduced in 1954, an improved variant of the 400-420. It weighs 885 kg (1,951 lb). and was powered by an 1,074 cc (65.5 cu in) sidevalve inline four engine, uprated from 23 hp (17 kW; 23 PS) to 26 hp (19 kW; 26 PS), thanks to a higher compression ratio, of 6.2:1, and improved intake and exhaust manifolds. Other changes included a new starter motor, dynamo, wheel bearings, and handbrake.

Both models were externally identical. It had a top speed of 90 km/h (56 mph).

The 400-422 sedan delivery variant was renumbered 401-422. (Its production continued until December 1956.) There was also a pickup version, the 401-420B.

Some of the production was exported, among other countries to East Germany and Norway. Production ended in 1956, when the design was heavily outdated. Private users in Norway at the time needed a foreign exchange permit to buy a new imported car. This did not apply to Russian cars that as a "friendly gesture" were supplied in exchange for fish.

Production of the saloon ended 20 April 1956, when it was replaced by Moskvitch 402. 247,439 had been built, counting both the 400 and 401.
