= Cummins F Series engine =

Family of diesel engines

Cummins F-Series Engine

Overview
- Manufacturer: Cummins
- Also called: F2.8/F3.8/ISF/QSF
- Production: 2007–present

Layout
- Configuration: I4
- Displacement: 2.771 L; 169.1 cu in (2,771 cc) (F2.8); 3.8 L; 229.3 cu in (3,758 cc) (F3.8)
- Cylinder bore: 94 mm (3.70 in); 102 mm (4.02 in)
- Piston stroke: 100 mm (3.94 in); 115 mm (4.53 in)
- Cylinder block material: Cast iron
- Cylinder head material: Cast iron
- Valvetrain: Cam-in-block
- Compression ratio: 16.9:1 (F2.8), 17.2:1 (F3.8)

Combustion
- Turbocharger: Holset Engineering (variable)
- Fuel system: Common rail high pressure direct injection, symmetrical combustion chamber
- Management: Bosch mechanical with electronic advance
- Fuel type: Diesel
- Oil system: Wet sump
- Cooling system: Water cooled

Output
- Power output: 55–180 hp (41–134 kW)
- Torque output: 200–370 lb⋅ft (271–502 N⋅m)

Dimensions
- Dry weight: 355 kg (783 lb)

Emissions
- Emissions control systems: Electronic fuel control

The Cummins F Series is a family of inline four diesel engines produced by American manufacturer Cummins. It is used in light commercial vehicles such as Otokar Centro.
