= Argus As I =

1910s German piston aircraft engine

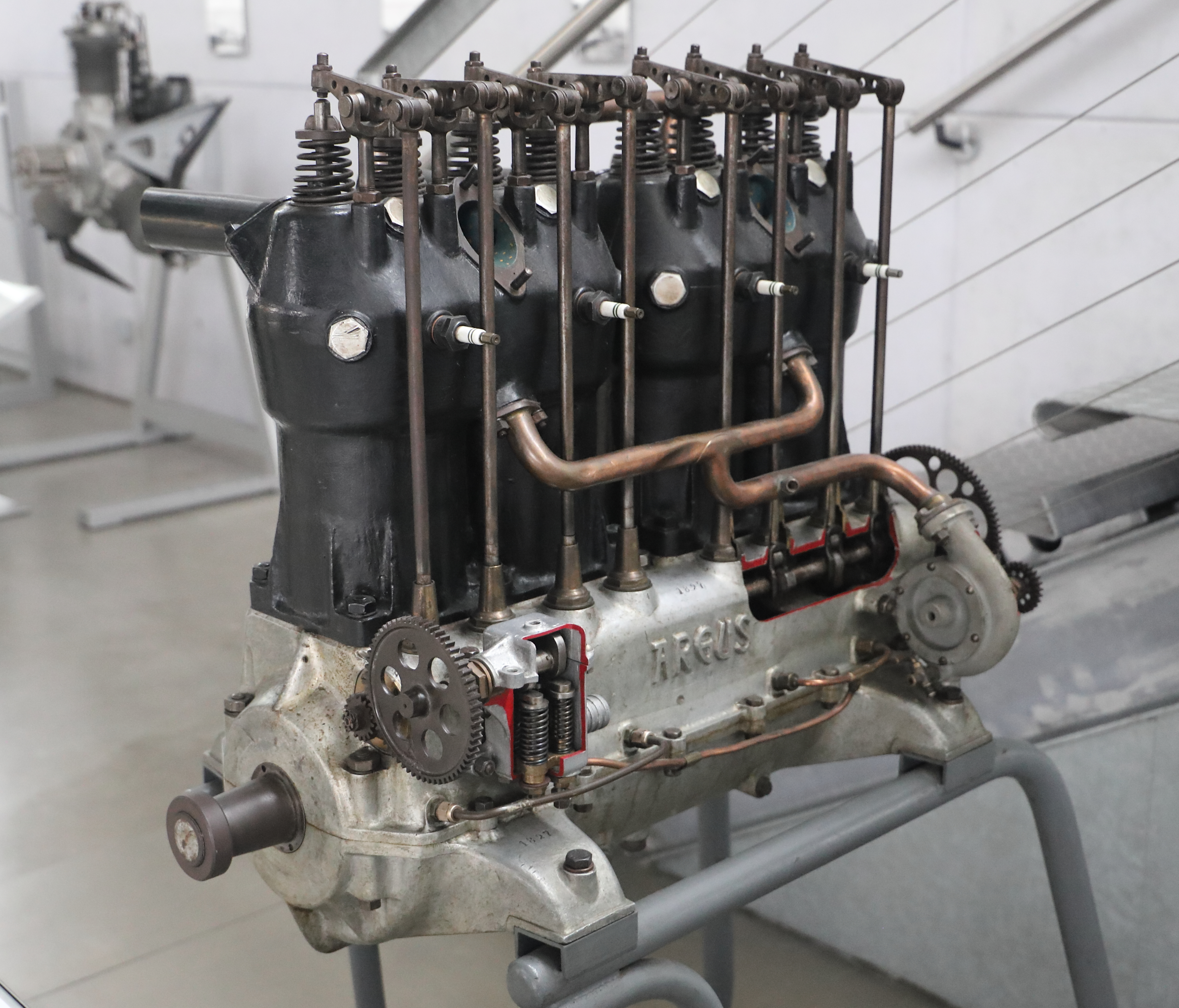
- Argus As I on display at the Deutsches Museum Flugwerft Schleissheim
- Type: Piston aero-engine
- National origin: Germany
- Manufacturer: Argus
- First run: c. 1911
- Major applications: Sikorsky Ilya Muromets
- Manufactured: c.1911-1913
- Developed from: Argus 70 hp

The Argus As I was a four-cylinder, water-cooled, aircraft engine produced in Germany by Argus Motoren from 1911 until about 1913.

The engine saw widespread use in aircraft in pre-war Germany and initially was also sold under the brand name 'Aviatik' of the Automobil und Aviatik AG. It also was license produced in France by Automobiles Rossel and sold in France under the brand names 'Aviatik' and 'Aviatic-Rossel' by Louis Clément, the local sales representative of the Automobil und Aviatik AG.

== Design and development ==
The 100 hp Argus As I first can be found in a 1911 brochure of the Automobil und Aviatik AG. It had a bore and stroke of 140 mm (5.5 in) and was rated 100 hp (75 kW) at 1,250 rpm. The general design of the engine was the same as the smaller Argus 70 hp four-cylinder engine.

The engine cylinders were of cast iron, cast in pairs of two cylinders, with the cooling jackets integral in the casting. There were two overhead valves per cylinder, which were operated via pushrods and rocker arms from the camshaft on the left side of the engine. The intake valves were oriented to the center of each cylinder pair, and their intake ducts were conjoined within the casting into a single external port facing to the left side of the engine. The intake manifold was made of cast aluminum and a single Cudell-G.A.-carburettor was installed.

The crankcase was made of aluminum and cast in separate upper and lower half parts, with the lower half having four mounting arms cast into it. Each cylinder pair was fixated to the crankcase by six bolts. The crankshaft was supported by two outer ball bearings and one intermediate plain bearing.

The camshaft was driven from the crankshaft by spur gears at the control end. The engine had one or two spark plugs per cylinder and a single Bosch-magneto located at the control side of the engine, driven from the crankshaft via an intermediate spur gear. The coolant was circulated by a centrifugal water pump which was installed on the carburettor side and driven from the camshaft gear.

== Applications ==
- Aviatik P 13
- Euler Taube
- Jeannin Stahltaube 1912/13
- LVG B.I
- Rumpler Taube
- Sikorsky Russky Vityaz
- Sikorsky Ilya Muromets

== Specifications ==
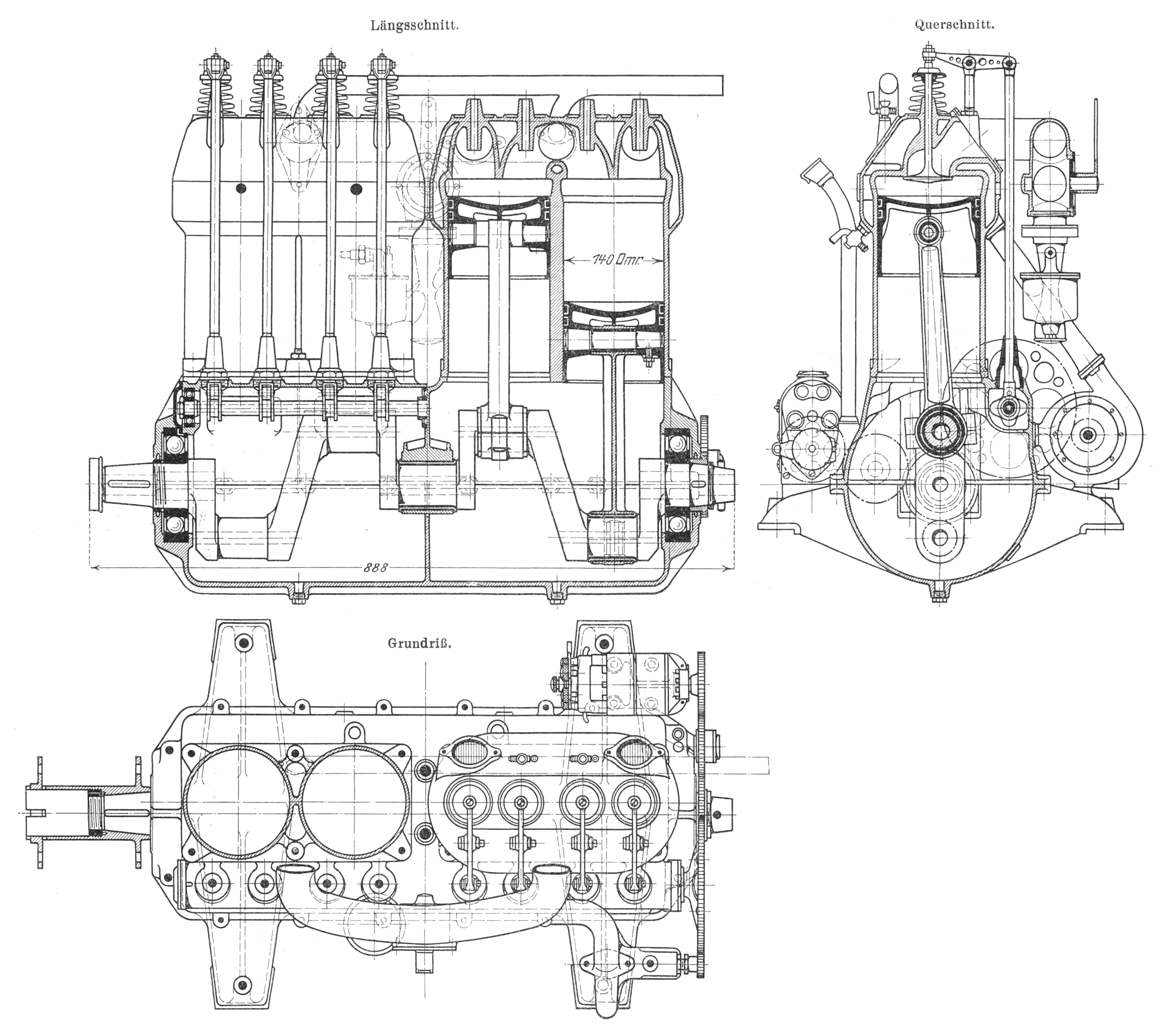
100 hp Argus As I 3-view drawing

Data from Huth

=== General characteristics ===
- Type: Four-cylinder, liquid-cooled piston engine
- Bore: 140 mm (5.51 in)
- Stroke: 140 mm (5.51 in)
- Displacement: 8.62 L (526 cu in)
- Dry weight: 140 kg (308.6 lb)

=== Components ===
- Valvetrain: one camshaft in the engine block, two overhead valves per cylinder actuated via roller tappets, pushrods and rocker arms
- Cooling system: Water-cooled
- Reduction gear: Direct-drive

=== Performance ===
- Power output: 100 PS (74 kW) at 1,250 rpm

== See also ==
Related development

- Argus 70 hp

Related lists

- List of aircraft engines
