= KIM-10 =

Soviet sedan car

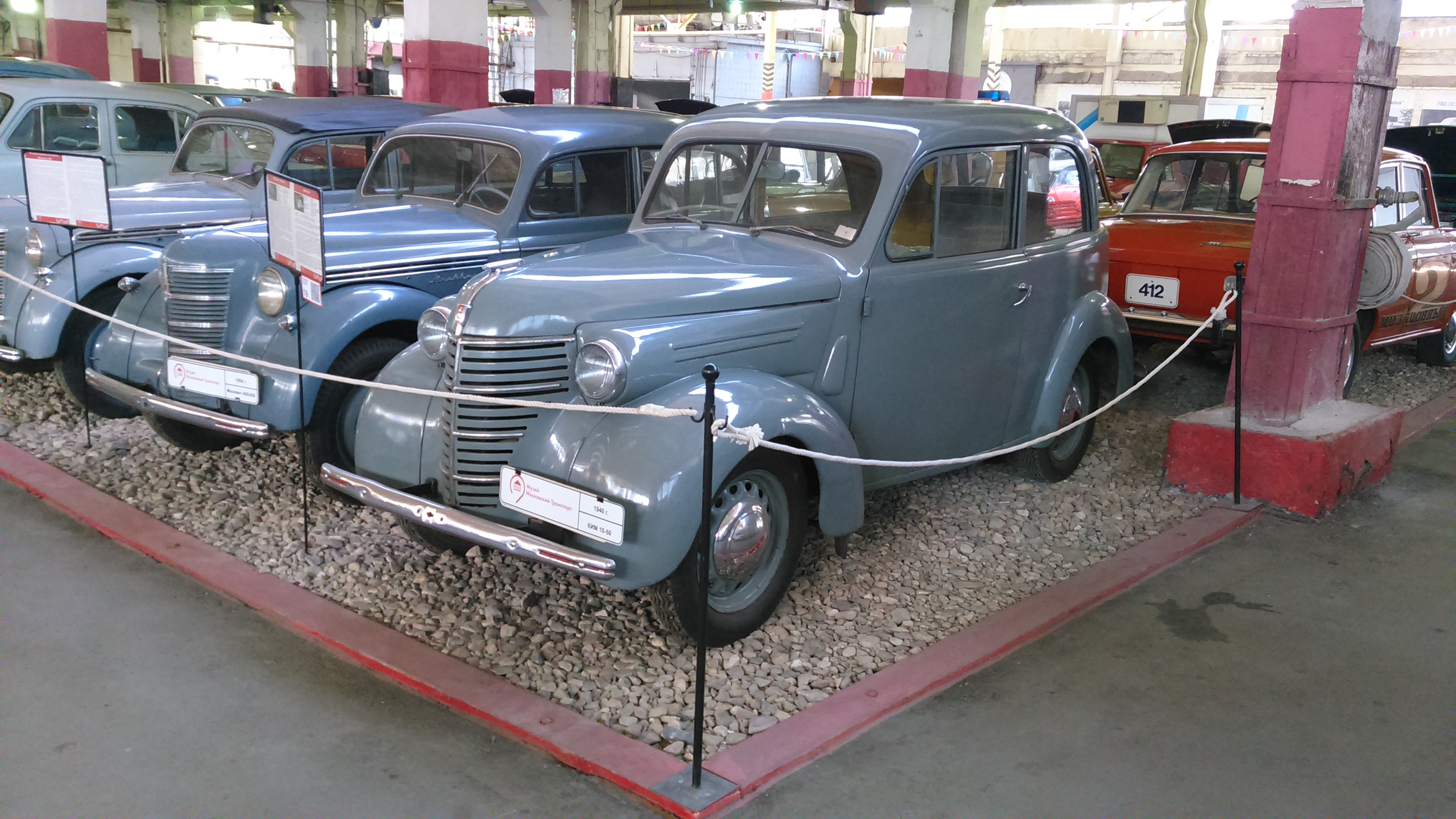

Overview
- Manufacturer: KIM
- Production: 1940—1953

Body and chassis
- Class: Compact car
- Body style: 2-door sedan; 2-door phaeton; 4-door sedan
- Layout: FR layout

Powertrain
- Engine: 4-cyl., 4-stroke, 1170 cc, 30 hp
- Transmission: 3-speed manual

Dimensions
- Wheelbase: 2,386 mm (93.9 in)
- Length: 3,940 mm (155.1 in)
- Width: 1,430 mm (56.3 in)
- Height: 1,630 mm (64.2 in)
- Curb weight: 840 kg (1,852 lb)

Chronology
- Predecessor: NAMI-1; Ford Model A
- Successor: Moskvitch 400

The KIM-10 was the first Soviet small car designed for large-scale mass production.

== History ==
The very first passenger car designed in the Soviet Union, the NAMI-1, was supposed to combine the simplicity, light weight and low cost of a cyclecar with the passenger capacity and comfort of a small car. It was considered quite a success from the engineering point and deemed very suitable for the country's still primitive road system. However, the project ultimately turned into a failure due to very limited experience in car building and lack of a modern industrial base. The Moscow State Automobile Plant No. 4 (also known as the "Avtomotor" plant; later renamed "Spartak"), assisted by the AMO and several other plants, managed to assemble only several hundred cars in 1927-31 (exact numbers vary considerably depending on the source). Old-fashioned production techniques and low scale resulted in mediocre build quality and high retail price – several times that of a locally assembled Ford Model A.

However, another automotive manufacturing project of late 1920s & early 30s—the GAZ plant, built with the assistance of Ford Motor Company—proved to be a success, with a designed capacity to produce up to 250-300,000 cars and trucks annually. The use of a readily available foreign technology allowed Russia to become a large-scale manufacturer of cars for the first time in its history. However, Ford cars were relatively large and heavy, and, while mass production made them relatively cheap, they still required a considerable amount of resources to build and maintain. It was considered uneconomical to provide such vehicles for personal use by individuals in any significant quantities. The cars produced were virtually all distributed between state and public organisations. The NAMI continued to work on lighter, smaller cars based on the NAMI-1 design, which could complement the GAZ cars as a cheaper alternative, but with little success.

The situation had changed considerably by the end of 1930s, when USSR's rapidly growing industrial economy provided both the demand for a personally used small car and the means to produce it. As well as improving the quality of life for the citizens affected, it was assumed that people who had learned to drive in peacetime would, in the event of armed conflict, constituted a cadre of trained drivers for the Red army.

In December 1930 the Moscow State Automotive Assembly Plant No. 2, which had started assembling Ford cars and trucks from CKD kits earlier that year, was named after the Young Communist International organization (Kommunisticheskiy Internatsional Molodyozhi – KIM). In 1939 it was reorganized as a full-cycle car manufacturing plant and renamed accordingly.

The plant's newly formed design department was headed by A. N. Ostrovtsev, an engineer from the NAMI, and tasked by the Economic Committee of Sovnarkom with designing a small economy car suitable for large scale manufacture which was named KIM-10. Initially two sub-models were planned for release – KIM-10-50 sedan and KIM-10-51 phaeton (convertible). The Economic Committee demanded the car to be based on the British Ford Prefect E93A – essentially a scaled-down version of Ford's larger U.S. models which the Soviet engineers and car mechanics were quite familiar with. The Prefect's chassis and powertrain were reverse engineered, the resulting drawings converted into the metric system and adapted to the Soviet materials and production techniques. The project was completed ahead of schedule by 13 June 1939.

Pre-production KIM-10-50

Valentin Brodskiy, a GAZ designer later to become famous for his work on the M-20 Pobeda, developed an original body for this chassis, with the frontal styling reminiscent of the flagship model of the Soviet automotive industry, the ZIS-101A. The wooden master-model was sent to the Budd Company of USA, which developed detailed blueprints, manufactured the necessary stamping equipment and stamped 500 test bodies in white.

In the meantime, the Sovnarkom was becoming increasingly unhappy with the design of the car, which significantly deviated from the original specifications of the Economic Committee during the development cycle. In August 1940 it adopted a resolution, "On the KIM small litrage car," stating that the People's Commissariat of Medium Machine-Building, and its head I. A. Likhachyov personally, had made several unauthorized alterations to the specifications which significantly worsened the car's technical and economic qualities, including the increase of length and height, two doors instead of four and chromed moldings on the body sides.

The Sovnarkom demanded these alterations to be reversed before the start of mass production, and also requested several other changes, including increase of the road clearance to at least 185 mm, removal of the running boards, replacement of the free-standing headlights with recessed units and substitution of the metal roof panel with an artificial leather insert.

In August and October 1940, the NATI (former NAMI) developed a very modern-looking streamlined four-door body for the KIM chassis (retrospectively named NATI-KIM), which to some degree resembled the German Auto-Union's prototype DKW F9. This body fulfilled all of the requirements set by the Sovnarkom with the exception of the soft insert into the roof, however it was not accepted. Instead, a more conservative body was approved, which closely followed the styling of the Opel Kadett K38, favored by Josef Stalin himself.

The car with the new four-door body was designated KIM-10-52, the chassis remained virtually unchanged. Mass production was planned to start in July 1941, with annual production figures of 50,000 units (30,000 in 1941). However, the plans never came to fruition because of the German invasion on 22 June 1941 - only a small series of four-door prototypes was ever built.

The original two-door version was more fortunate, as the plant was allowed to assemble 500 cars using the test bodies produced by Budd – 250 KIM-10-50 two-door sedans and 250 KIM-10-51 phaetons were initially planned to be built.

In November and December 1940 the KIM plant assembled 16 sedans, another 70 in January 1941, 50 in February, 102 in March and 100 in April – 338 units altogether. The exact production numbers for the phaeton are unknown, but they were extremely rare even when new. The production was assisted by ZIS (supplied frames, leaf springs, large forgings), GAZ (stampings and castings), Moscow "Ball Bearing" plant, "Red Etna" factory in Gorky and up to 90 other industrial facilities. There were few differences between the prototypes and the production cars, including the use of recessed headlights and the absence of body side moldings and running boards on the latter.

In October 1941 the plant was hastily evacuated to Ural. Most of the manufacturing equipment was abandoned or destroyed during the Siege of Moscow.

== Sales and surviving examples ==
No version of the KIM-10 was ever officially sold to the general public. 64 cars were awarded as prizes in the 15th tour of the OSOAVIAKhIM lottery, with a listed price of 7000 roubles (for the scale, the GAZ M-1 was listed for 9500 roubles). Most KIMs were lost during the war of 1941-45, in which they saw active service. Only several cars survive to this day in the expositions of various museums.

== Reception ==
The KIM-10 received generally positive reviews from the operators. Conservative mechanicals proved to be simple and robust, and the styling was one of the most advanced among the prewar Soviet passenger cars. The interior was quite roomy for the car's class, with individually adjustable separate front seats and a high back seat cushion which gave the passengers an unobstructed view over the heads of the driver and the front passenger.

The car was also found to be somewhat underpowered and have insufficient road clearance, however just as its British counterpart, the KIM was designed neither for high-speed motoring, nor for the bumpy rural roads.

Starting on 12 May 1941 the Red Army subjected one of the production cars (chassis No. 178) to a series of tests, including 4512 km in road conditions varying from the newly built Moscow-Minsk asphalted highway to rural mud roads and off-road. Despite the official "mostly satisfactory" mark, the car proved to be unsuited to the requirements of the military service.

== Further development ==
After the war the USSR managed to obtain the production lines for the four-door version of the Opel Kadett K38 as a part of the war reparations package. This car was quite close to the KIM-10-52 in specifications and appearance, making it a suitable replacement. The equipment was installed at the former KIM plant which was renamed MZMA (Moscow Small Car Plant). In 1946 it started producing cars under "Moskvitch" brand.

== Technical details ==
The side-valve engine of the KIM-10 had a displacement of 1170 cm³ and produced 30 hp. Its cooling system lacked a water pump, relying on thermocirculation instead, and a thermostat, the latter being quite impractical during cold Russian winters because the engine took a lot of time to warm up.

Rear wheels were driven via a 3-speed manual transmission, with synchromesh on II and III (direct drive) gears.

Suspension employed transverse leaf springs, both front and rear.

Brakes were mechanically operated drums on all four wheels.

Chassis components were mounted on a separate frame which was rigidly riveted to the body.
