= Friedrichshafen FF.8 =

General information
- Type: Reconnaissance floatplane
- National origin: Germany
- Manufacturer: Flugzeugbau Friedrichshafen GmbH
- Number built: 1

The Friedrichshafen FF.8 was a seaplane built in Germany in the early 1910s.

== Specifications (FF.8) ==
Data from

General characteristics

- Crew: 2
- Length: 11 m (36 ft 1 in)
- Wingspan: 13 m (42 ft 8 in)
- Height: 3.6 m (11 ft 10 in)
- Wing area: 22 m^{2} (240 sq ft)
- Gross weight: 620 kg (1,367 lb)
- Powerplant: 1 × Argus 4-cylinder water-cooled in-line piston engine, 48 kW (65 hp)
- Propellers: 2-bladed fixed-pitch propeller

Performance

- Maximum speed: 95 km/h (59 mph, 51 kn)
- Cruise speed: 85 km/h (53 mph, 46 kn)

== Bibliography ==
- Herris, Jack (2016). Friedrichshafen Aircraft of WWI: A Centennial Perspective on Great War Airplanes. Great War Aviation Centennial Series. Vol. 21. Charleston, South Carolina: Aeronaut Books. ISBN 978-1-935881-35-3.
