= Cudell =

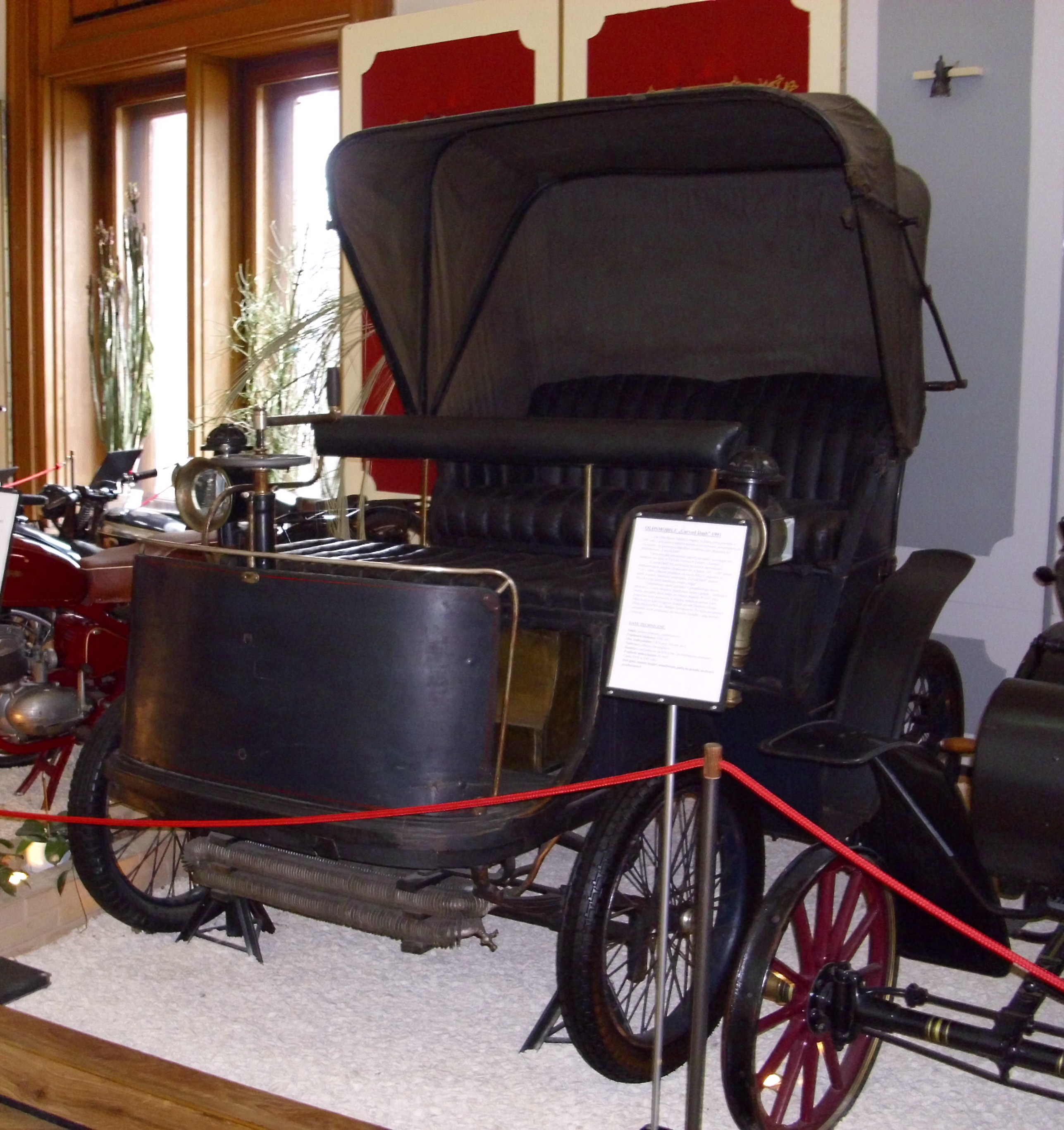
- 1899 Cudell

Overview
- Production: 1898–1908
- Assembly: Aachen, Germany (1898–1905); Berlin, Germany (1905–1908)
- Designer: Karl Slevogt

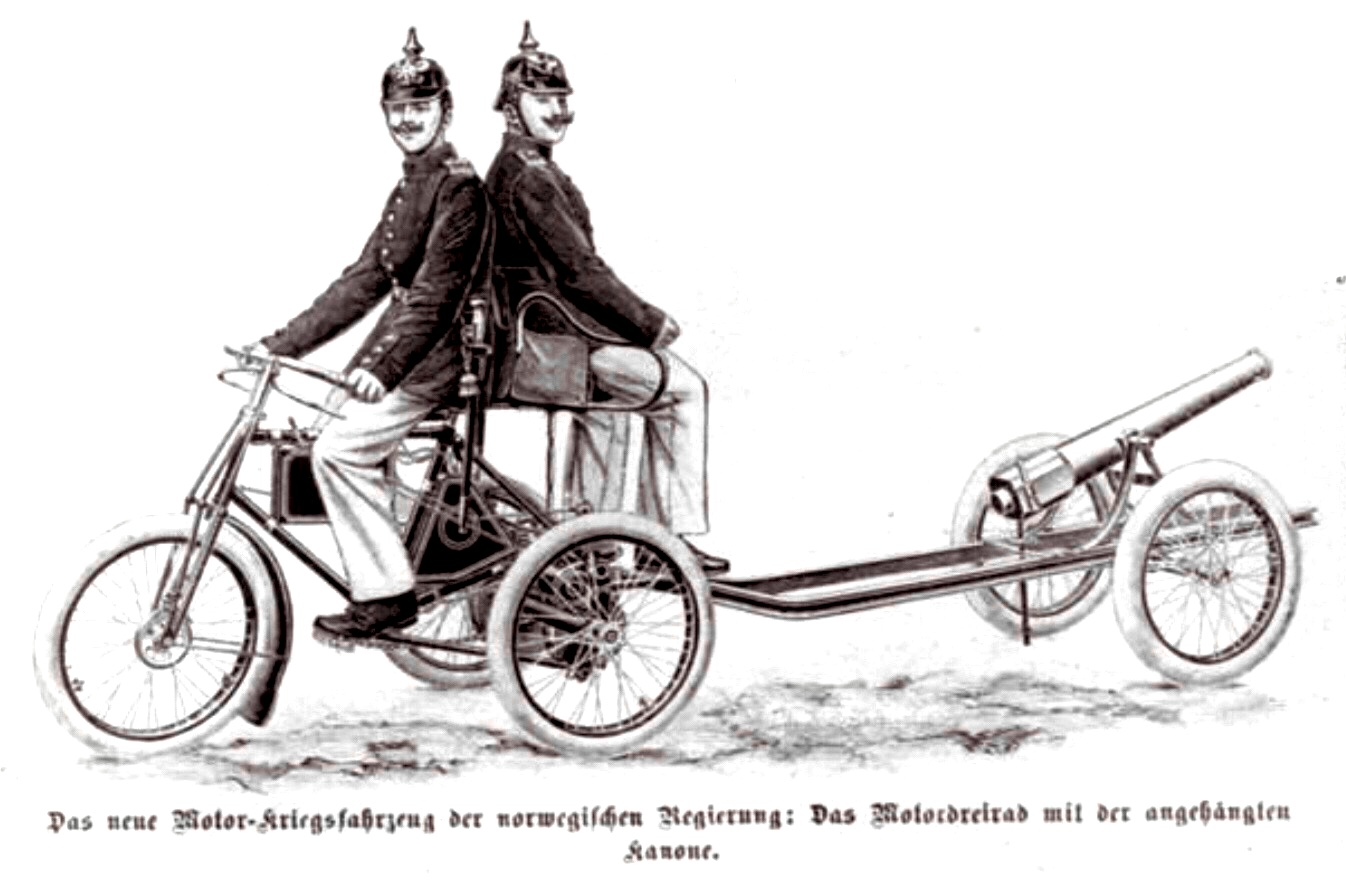
Cudell & Cie 2,75 HP Tricycle for the Norwegian Army (1900)

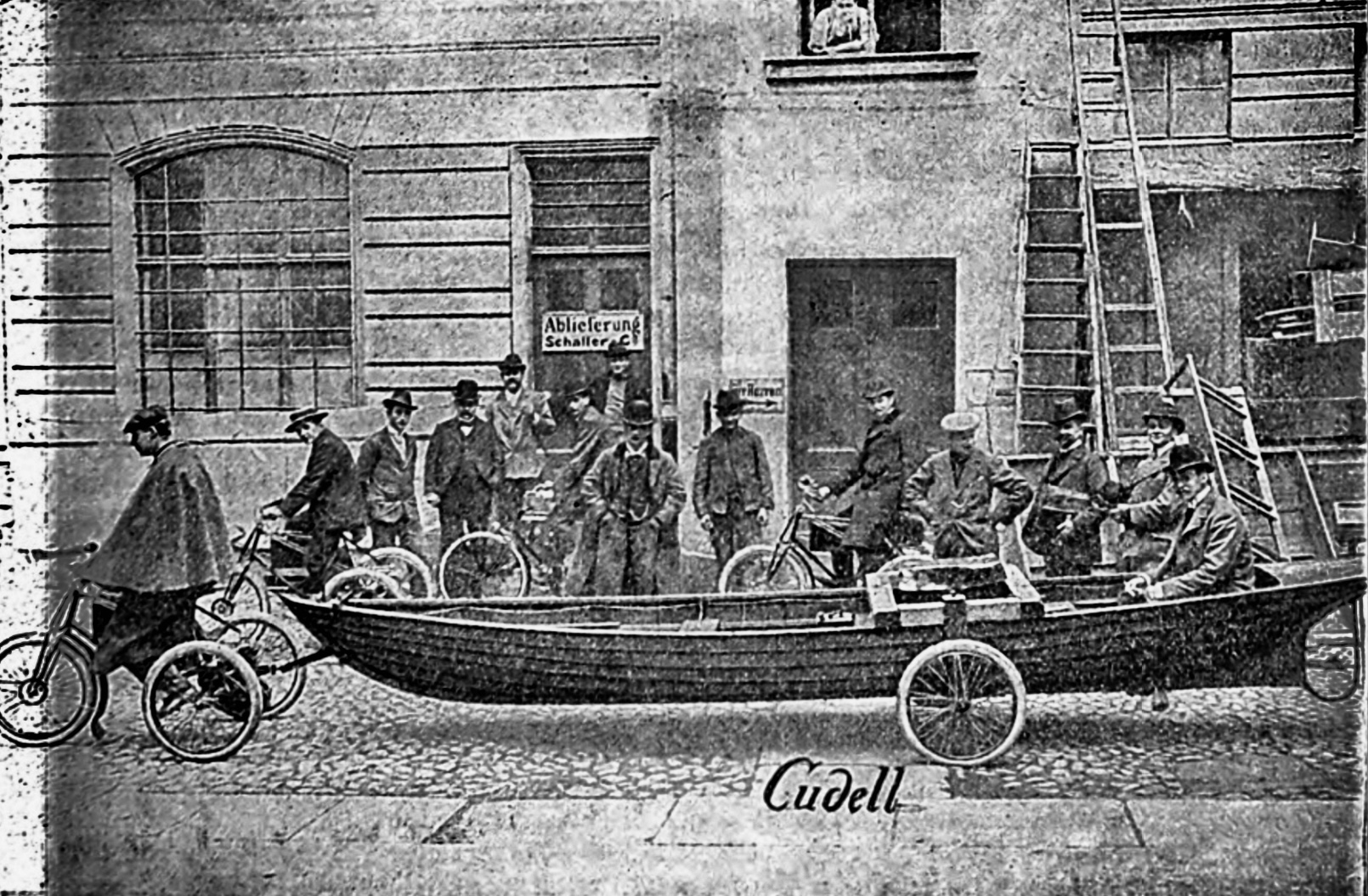
Cudell Boat (1899).

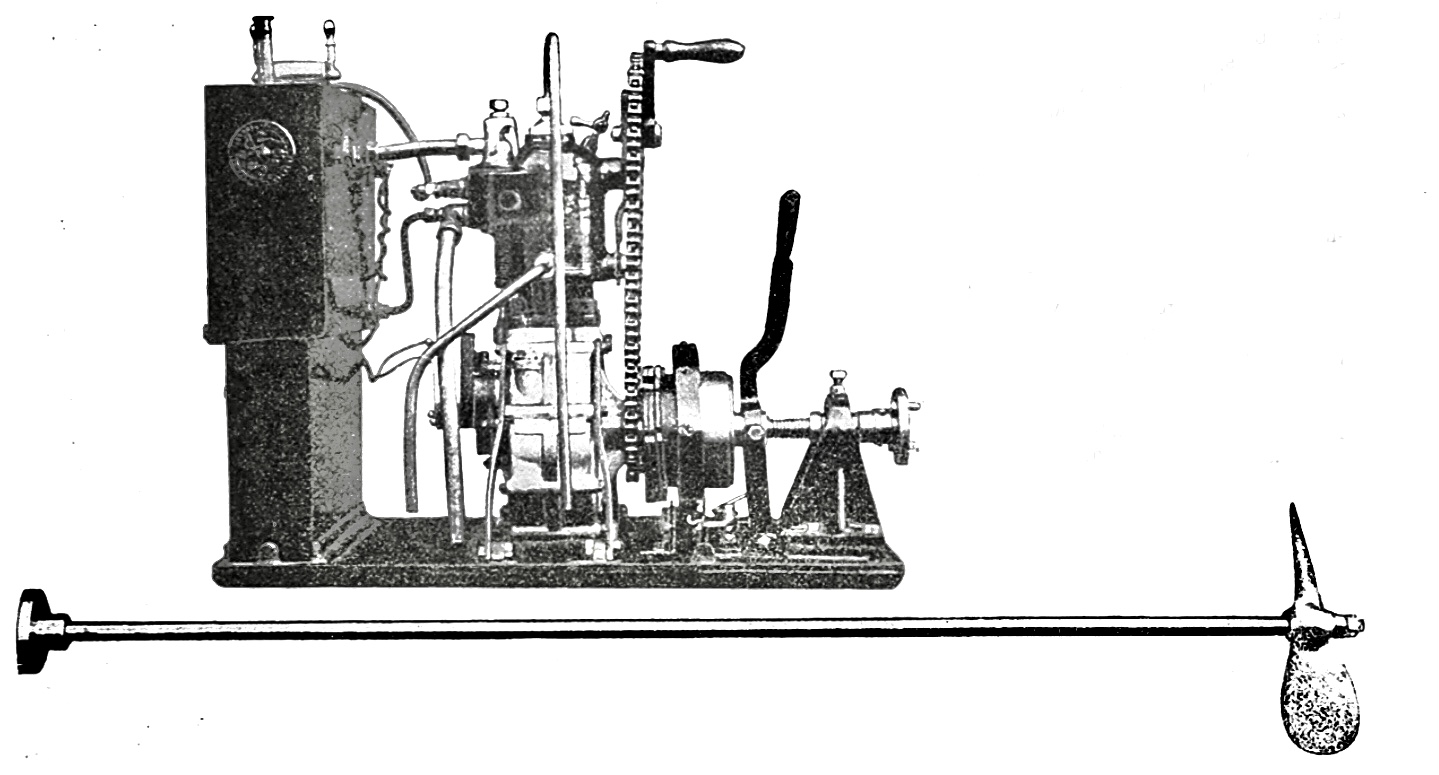
Cudell Powertrain Motorboat (1899).

The Cudell was a Prussian-German car made from 1898 to 1908. It was made in Aachen until 1905, and subsequently in Berlin.

Cudell 3,5 HP Patentmotorwagen
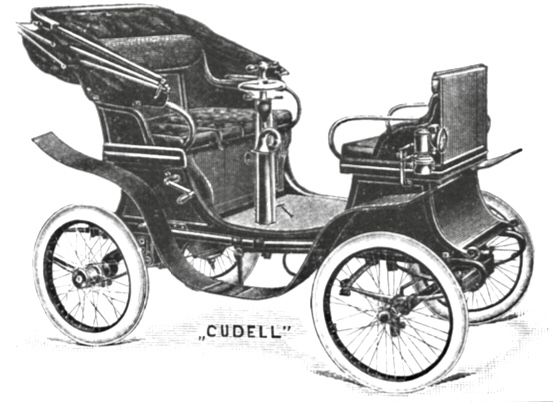

Overview
- Production: 1899–1901
- Assembly: Germany: Aachen

Powertrain
- Engine: Petrol: 0.4 L 3,5 hp

Dimensions
- Wheelbase: 1,360 mm (53.5 in)
- Length: 2,050 mm (80.7 in)
- Height: 1,160 mm (45.7 in)
- Curb weight: 260 kg

Chronology
- Predecessor: Cudell 1,75 HP Three-wheeler
- Successor: Cudell 6 HP

Max Cudell founded the company in 1898 to manufacture licensed De Dion-Bouton vehicles. The original 3-wheelers were succeeded by a 3.5 hp voiturette. The 3.5 HP Patent Motor Car from Cudell was presented in 1899 at the International Motor Car Exhibition in Berlin. The frame was made of seamless tubes. The pneumatic tires of the rear wheels were 700x 90 mm. The front wheels had the size 700x 65 mm. The vehicle length was 2050 mm, the height 1160 mm and the wheelbase 1360 mm. The vehicle weight was 260 kg.The single-cylinder four-stroke engine of the de Dion Bouton type produced 3.5 hp. The displacement was 402 cc with 80 mm bore and 80 mm stroke. The cooling circuit had a circulation pump and a radiator located on the front axle. Only 1 liter of evaporation water had to be topped up every 100 km. The gearbox had two gears. At the international motor show, Cudell exhibited a boat with the single-cylinder engine from the tricycle. The engine power here was 2 HP instead of 1.75 HP as in the three-wheeler. The three-wheeler could be used as a towing vehicle. These were followed by more De Dion-style vehicles until 1904. In that year, vehicles designed by Karl Slevogt premiered with little, if any, resemblance to the former French-influenced models. These new cars featured an advanced 4-cylinder engine that had a 5-bearing crankshaft and overhead valves. Versions of the engines ranged from 16/20 PS to a 6.1L 35/40 PS. In 1904, a fire destroyed the assembly hall and the warehouse building in Aachen. In 1905, the Aachen site was abandoned, and all further activities were relocated to Berlin. The Berlin branch was headed by Paul Cudell and did not make many cars. After auto manufacture was stopped, the company continued to manufacture marine engines, as well as a carburetor of the same name.

The US agent Clodio & Widmayer based at 10 West 33rd Street in New York City presented Cudell vehicles at the 1904 New York Automobile Show. A five-passenger vehicle with a four-cylinder, 16 hp, air-cooled engine, four speed transmission with reverse, and a steel and wood frame for was offered at a price of US$4,500. A version with 22 hp and water-cooling was offered as well.

== Bibliography ==
- Georgano, G.N. (2001). The Beaulieu Encyclopedia of the Automobile. Chicago: Fitzroy Dearborn. ISBN 1-57958-293-1.
- Deetjen, R. (1910). Motorboote und Bootsmotoren. Yachtbibliothek Bd. 3 (in German). Berlin: Verlag Dr. Wedekind & Co. p. 368a.
