= Cam-in-block =

A cam-in-block engine is where the camshaft is located in the engine block. Types of cam-in-block engines are:

- F-Head Engine
- Flathead engine
- Overhead valve engine (the only type where the valves are above the combustion chamber)
- T-head engine
