= Heinrich Ehrhardt =

German inventor and entrepreneur

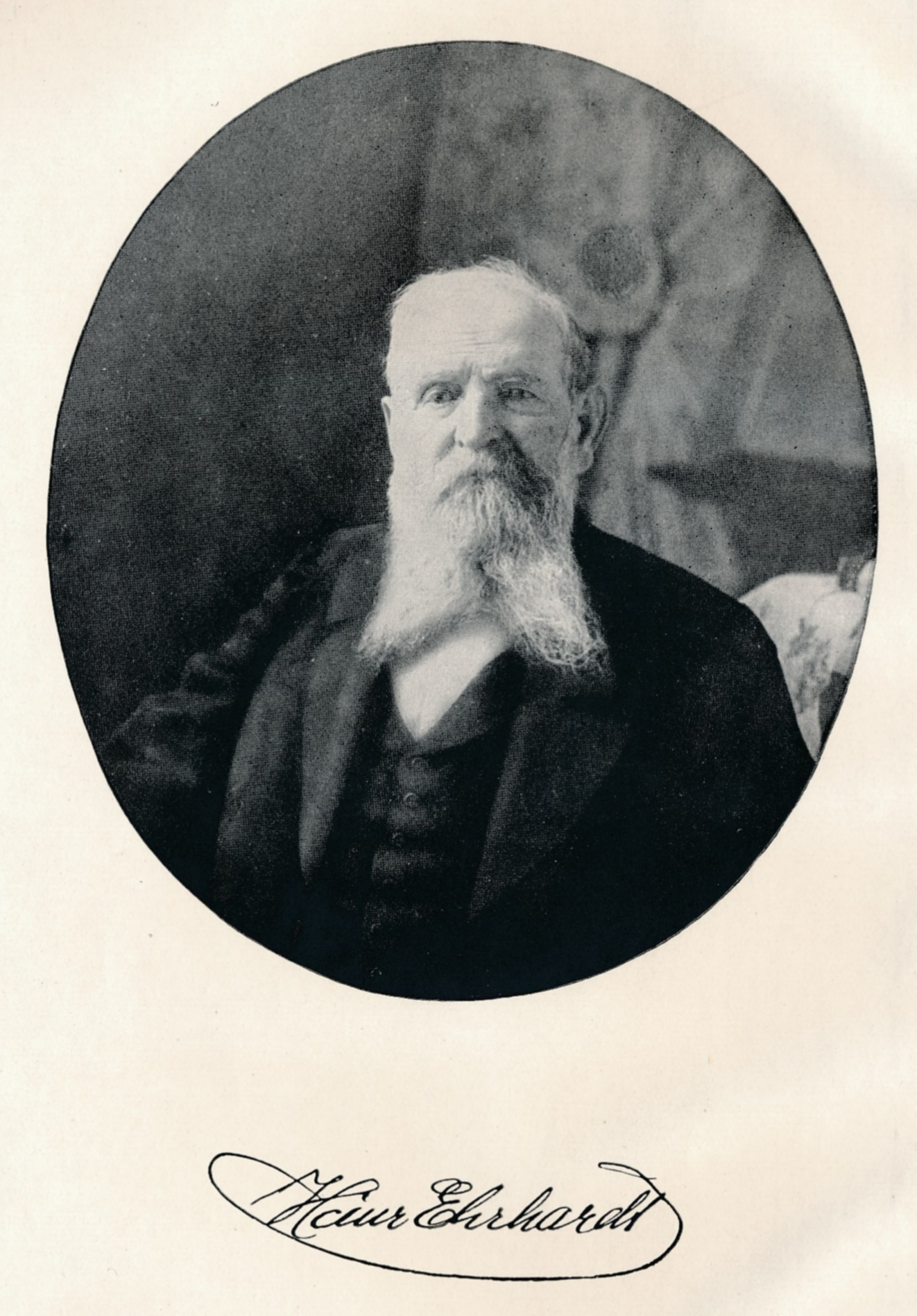
Heinrich Ehrhardt

Heinrich Ehrhardt (17 November 1840 in Zella St. Blasius – 20 November 1928 in Zella-Mehlis) was a German inventor, industrialist and entrepreneur.

== Family ==
Father Gottlieb Reuter (Weinsberg), mother Barbara Ehrhardt. Both were engaged but engagement was ended by Reuter's father. The Ehrhardt family was socially not acceptable for him.

Ehrhardt's grandfather was a gunstock maker with six kids. His uncle was the locomotive manufacturer and inventor Johann Heinrich Ehrhardt.

Heinrich Ehrhardt was married to Augustine Winckler with six kids.

His first Son was Gustav Ehrhardt, later first director of Fahrzeugfabrik Eisenach (FFE).

== Career ==
After finishing Volksschule, Ehrhardt began an apprenticeship in his uncle Peter Ehrhardt's workshop in Zella St Blasii (later renamed into Zella-Mehlis)

His journeyman years began in the Erfurt Railway Workshop. He spent his salary for private lessons about calculation, ballistic and technical drawing.

He later moved to an Erfurt casting foundry named "Eisengießerei Wedel" and rifle factory "Dreyse" in Soemmerda.

Early 1864, he studied and worked at the company Richard Hartmann in Chemnitz, which was the largest Saxon company.

Until 1866 he moved to several other Chemnitz companies. In Septemper 1866 Ehrhardt started his first self-emplyment by renting a water-powered workshop in Zella St. Blasii. Together with his brother in law her created and sold fire engines and pumps. The business was not successful and ended at the end of 1869. Heinrich Ehrhardt returned to his wifes's family to Chemnitz.

From January 1870 he worked as a forman in the Herman Kuhlke Machine Factory in Sommerfeld (Schlesia) but resigned due to disagreements with the founder and returned to Chemnitz again.

His second self-employment started in January 1870. This times he offered services as civil engineer and worked as sales representative for Reinert Tool company and Koenig and Neunert Steelworks (Annen near Essen).

In March 1872 he accepted an offer to get employed by Koenig and Neunert Steelworks and moved to Essen. As this company converted into a public limited company, Ehrhardt expected to take over role in management board as technical director. This never happened and he left company end of 1872.

In springtime 1873 he moved to Düsseldorf and opened an office were he resumed as civil engineer.

Business became a success and was the foundation of his later welth.

== Patents and start-ups ==
He registered 128 patents in the German Empire. In 1891 he patented the process that became known as the "Ehrhardt's pressing and drawing method" for the manufacture of seamless tubes and used the process to manufacture shrapnel and shell casings from steel instead of cast iron, an innovative at the time.

He founded in 1878, among other things, a metal and arms factory in Zella St. Blasius, in 1889, the Rheinische Metallwaren- und Maschinenfabrik AG in Düsseldorf, in 1896, the Fahrzeugfabrik Eisenach later named as Automobilwerk Eisenach and the Blasius 1903 Ehrhardt Automobil AG. He tended to conduct R&D at a small factory in Zella fully controlled by him, personally own the patents and license them to public companies he managed/co-owned, and the firms he was affiliated with made a very loose conglomerate; this fact negated the consequences of a hostile takeover of Rheinmetall by Krupp in 1913.

In 1895, he was contacted former Krupp engineer Konrad Haussner, who patented the idea of an innovative quick-firing gun and wanted to continue designing a real one. Ehrhardt recognized the prospectives of the design, and Haussner's far-reaching hiring in 1896 turned Rheinmetall from an unexceptional ammunition manufacturer (which did not even make the fuses for shell) to a leading European arms manufacturer in a decade.

Despite the fact that the 1896 prototype was turned down by the German Artillery Testing Commission as not yet usable in the war (a simpler 7.7 cm FK 96 was adopted instead), in 1900 Great Britain adopted Haussner's design as the QF 15-pounder gun (even though just as a stopgap measure), to be followed by Norway a year later with a gun which will participate in WWII. Later the United States Army Ordnance Department decided to buy the rights from Ehrhardt in order to combine them with an existing design by Captain Charles B. Wheeler in the 3-inch M1902 field gun, and the Austro-Hungarian Army followed suit with their 8 cm FK M. 5. The Artillery Construction Bureau of the Imperial German Army in Spandau did the same to develop the 7.7 cm FK 96 n.A. in 1904 with the only difference that Ehrhardt gave the patents for free in return for "favorable consideration when placing orders" for manufacturing the guns.

In 1920, at the age of about 80, Ehrhardt resigned from the leadership of Rheinmetall.

== Commercial vehicle ==
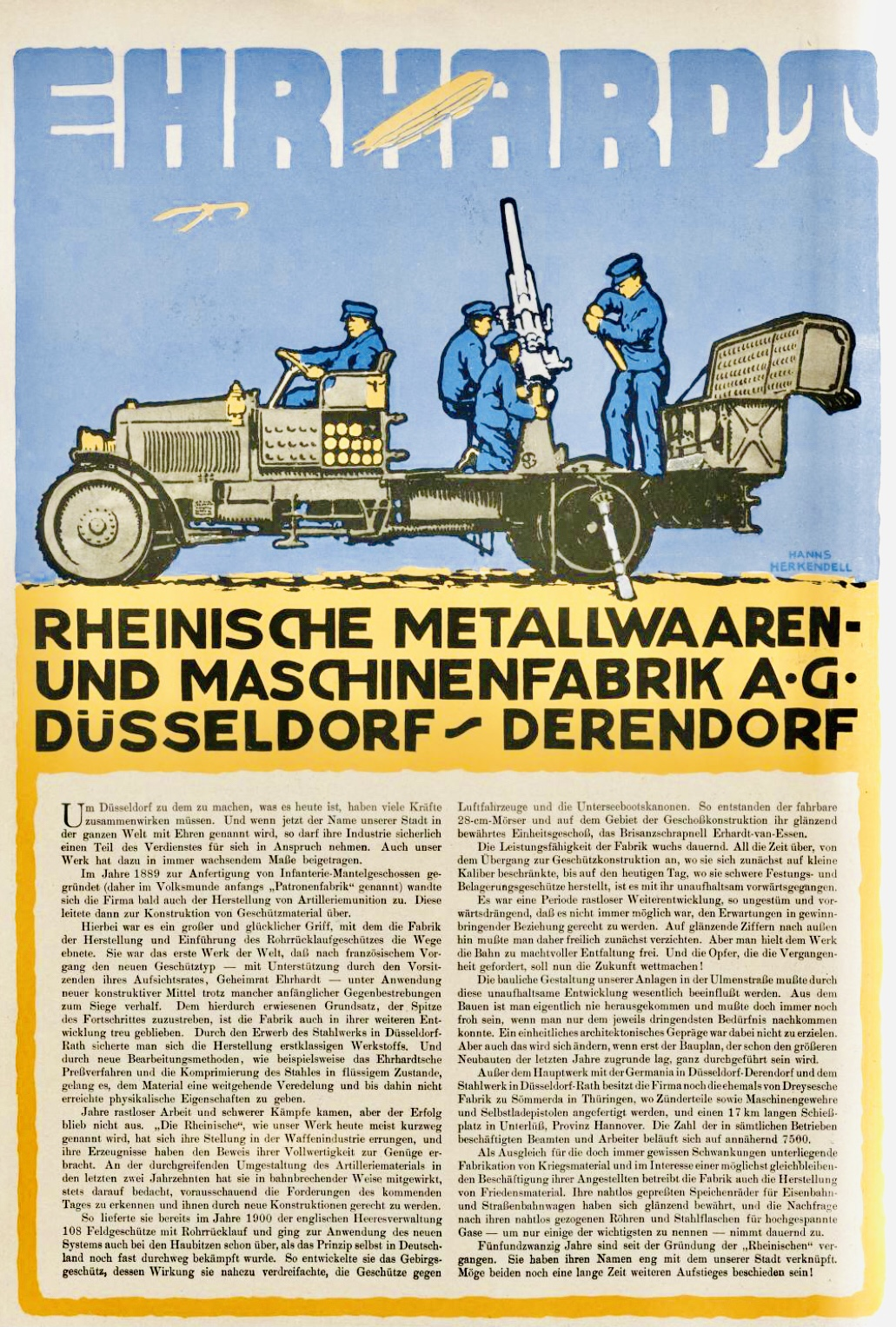
Ehrhardt (1914)

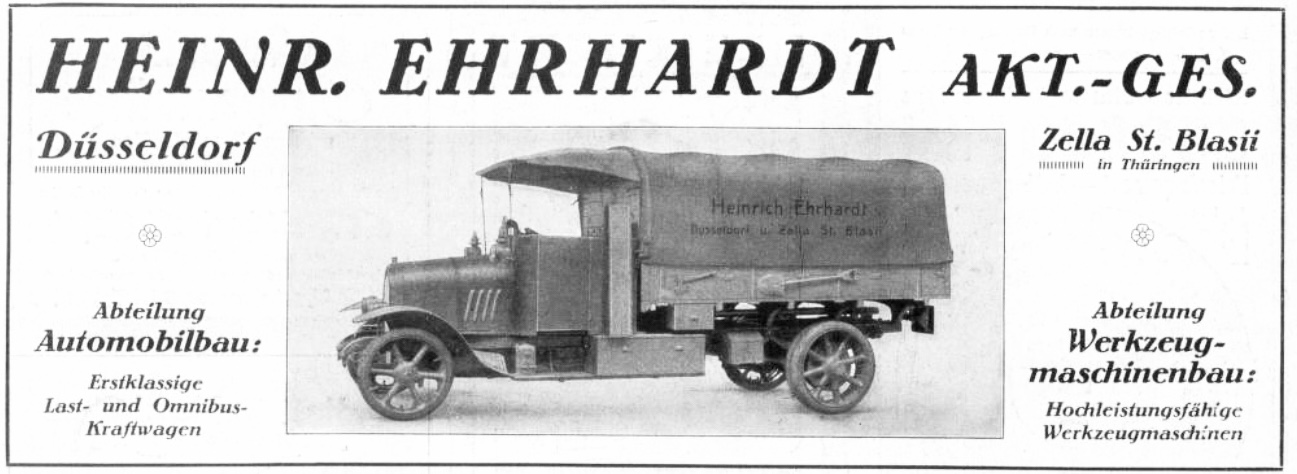
Heinrich Ehrhardt Commercial vehicle (1918)

Heinrich Ehrhardt taught in 1903 in his hometown of Zella St. Blasius. He created the Gustav Ehrhardt Automobile AG for passenger utility vehicles. This automobile factory, which was housed in the Maschinenfabrik has existed since 1878. Since 1903 trucks were built for the imperial army administration. From 1906, subsidized by the German Reich, only trucks were built. Purchasers had to establish that the army would have access to them in case of war. The Ehrhardt truck years had eleven types. Its gross vehicle weight ranged from 2.5 to 6 tons. A balloon defense special vehicle was built with eight tons dead weight at the start of the war. In 1924 two types of trucks were built with 35 hp and 80 hp. In 1925 the commercial vehicle industry was shut down.

== Passenger cars ==
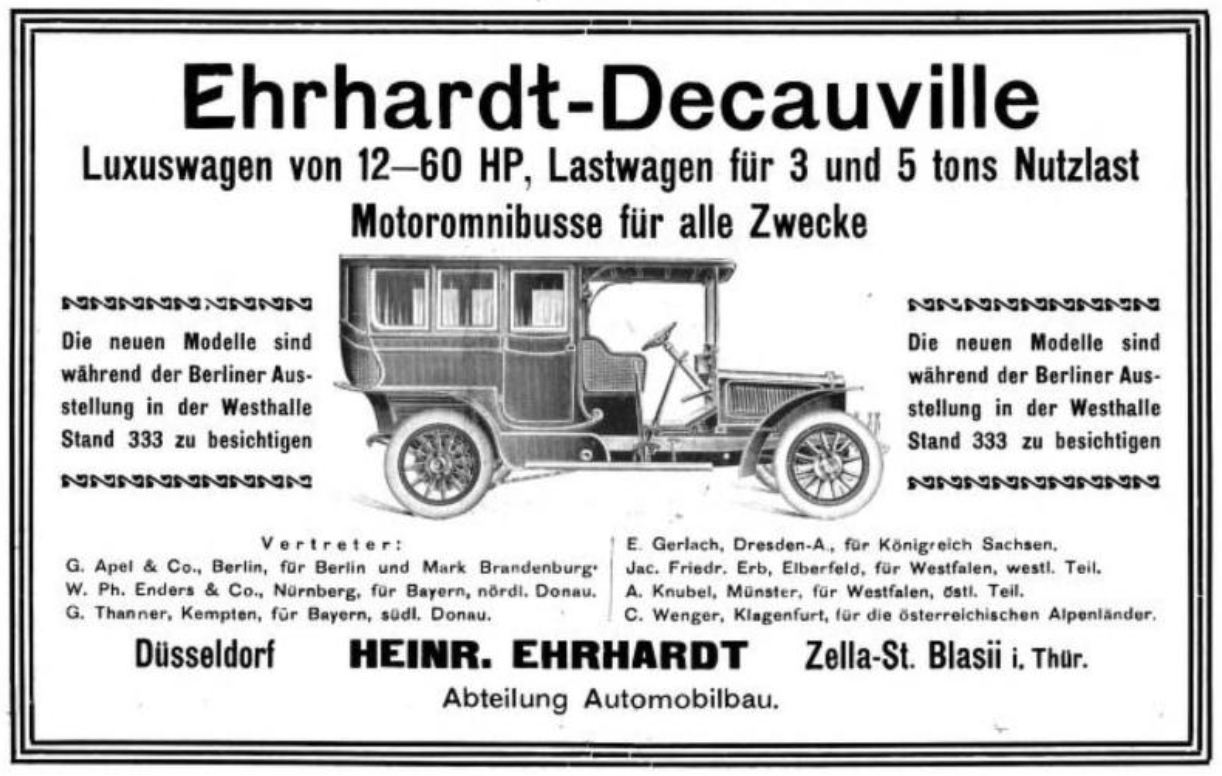
Ehrhardt Decauville advertisement (1906)

Ehrhardt initially had 31.2 percent ownership in the joint-stock company vehicle factory Eisenach (FFE). This was the vehicle factory that became Germany's third auto maker. Guns and bicycles were manufactured under the "Wartburg" brand, and by the end of 1898 car production had begun under the same name. The Wartburg motor car was modeled after the French two-cylinder engine "Decauville". Ehrhardt's son Gustav led the plant in Eisenach. Its 1,300 workers made the firm one of Thuringia's largest.

In order to convince the public and shareholders of the quality of the "Wartburg"-Motorwagens, Heinrich Ehrhardt and a companion drove up a steep road to show that the car could handle the climb.

In 1903, Ehrhardt withdrew after losses and disagreements other shareholders. The Decauville license was taken away. He founded Ehrhardt Automobil AG, making luxury cars, such as the "Emperor class" limousine. A brochure from 1911 shows an output of 50 hp from 8 liters capacity. The price was 26,000 marks.

== Writings ==
- Ehrhardt, Heinrich (1923). Hammerschläge: 70 Jahre dt. Arbeiter u. Erfinder. Koehler.

== Sources ==
- George W. Oesterdiekhoff; Hermann Strasser : heads of the Ruhr. 200 years of industrial history and structural change in the light of biographies . Plaintext Verlag, Essen 2009, ISBN 978-3-8375-0036-3, pages 91-98.
- Hugo Racine: Ehrhardt, Henry. In: New German Biography (NDB). Volume 4, Duncker & Humblot, Berlin 1959. ISBN 3-428-00185-0, page 579 f.
- Joseph Wilder: Heinrich Ehrhardt (1840-1928). In: RWTH Economics Biographies, Volume IV Aschendorff, Münster 1941, pages 172–186..
- "Chronicle of the city Zella-Mehlis - Volume 2", Heinrich Jung-Verlag
- "History of the German truck construction", Volume 1 Pages 68 + 2a. S. 126. worldview Verlag 1994 ISBN 3-89350-811-2
