= Automobilwerk Eisenach =

Defunct German automobile manufacturer

Coordinates: 50.981111°N 10.321944°E

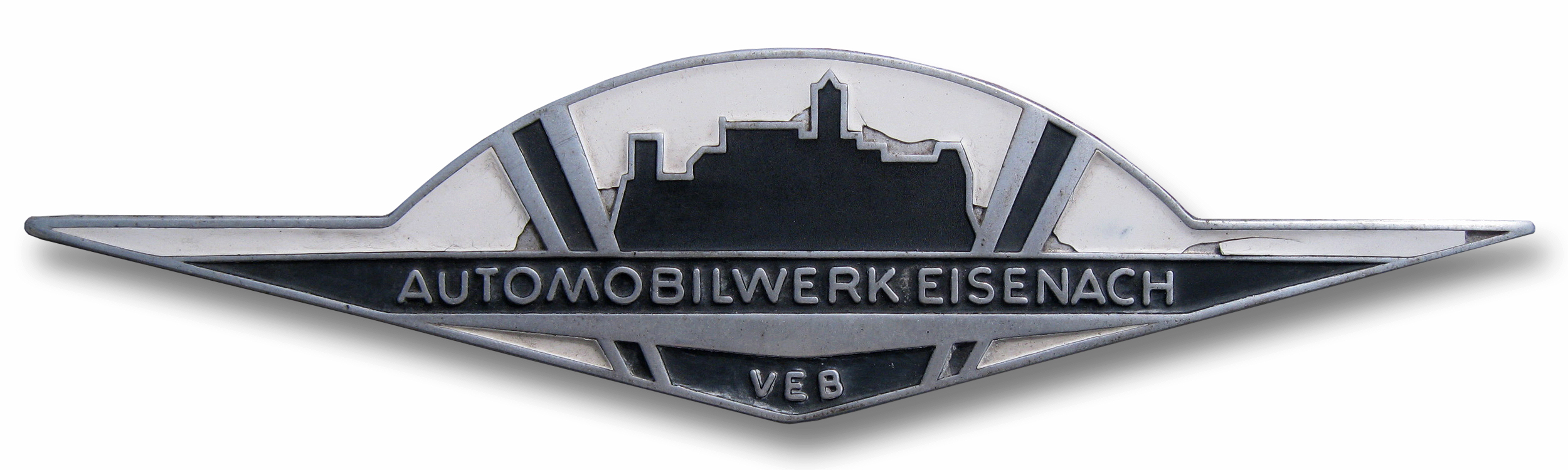
- Industry: Automobile manufacturing
- Founded: 3 December 1896
- Founder: Heinrich Ehrhardt
- Defunct: April 1991
- Headquarters: Eisenach, Germany
- Owner: Joint-stock company (1896–1928); BMW (1928–1945); Soviet Union (1945–1949); German Democratic Republic (1949–1990)

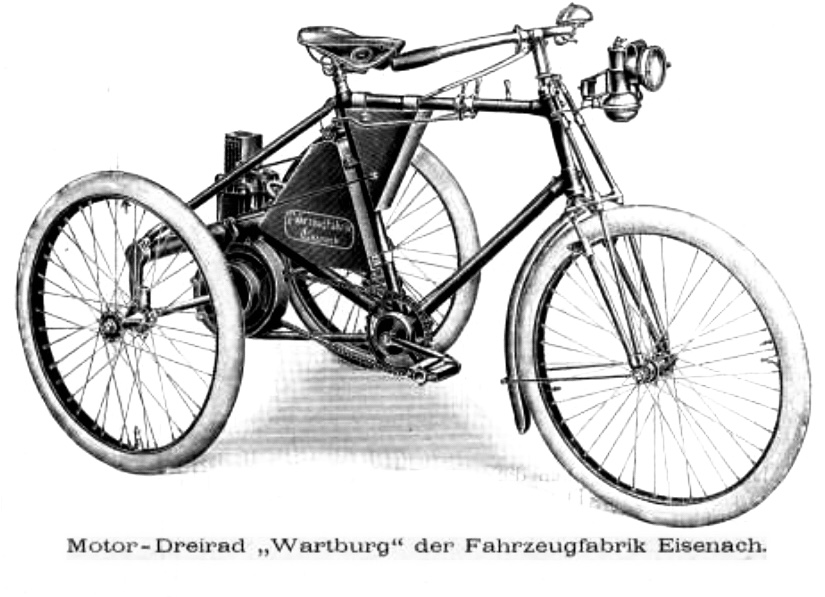
Wartburg motor tricycle (1899)

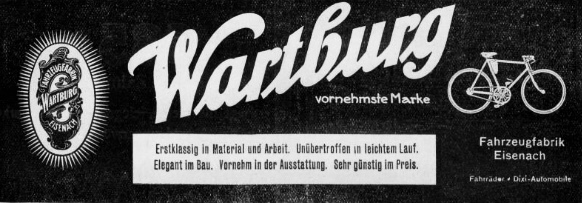
Wartburg bicycles (1914)

The Automobilwerk Eisenach (AWE; German pronunciation: [aʊtomoˈbiːlvɛʁk ˈaɪzənax]) was an automobile manufacturer located in Eisenach, Germany from 1896 to 1991. It is known as one of the largest automobile manufacturers in the German Democratic Republic (East Germany) and found most success with Wartburg, the second best-selling car marque in East Germany after Trabant.

AWE was founded by Heinrich Ehrhardt in 1896 as Fahrzeugfabrik Eisenachand which became one of the earliest autmobile manufacturers in Germany. AWE was purchased by BMW in 1928 and used the Eisenach factory to produce their automobiles and motorcycles until it was confiscated by the Soviet Union at the end of World War II in 1945. AWE became a VEB of East Germany in 1949, producing nearly 2 million vehicles during its operation and making it the second-largest automobile manufacturer in East Germany after Sachsenring. AWE was dissolved by the Treuhandanstalt in 1991, shortly after German reunification, and most its workforce was transferred to Opel Eisenach.

== History ==
=== Fahrzeugfabrik Eisenach ===
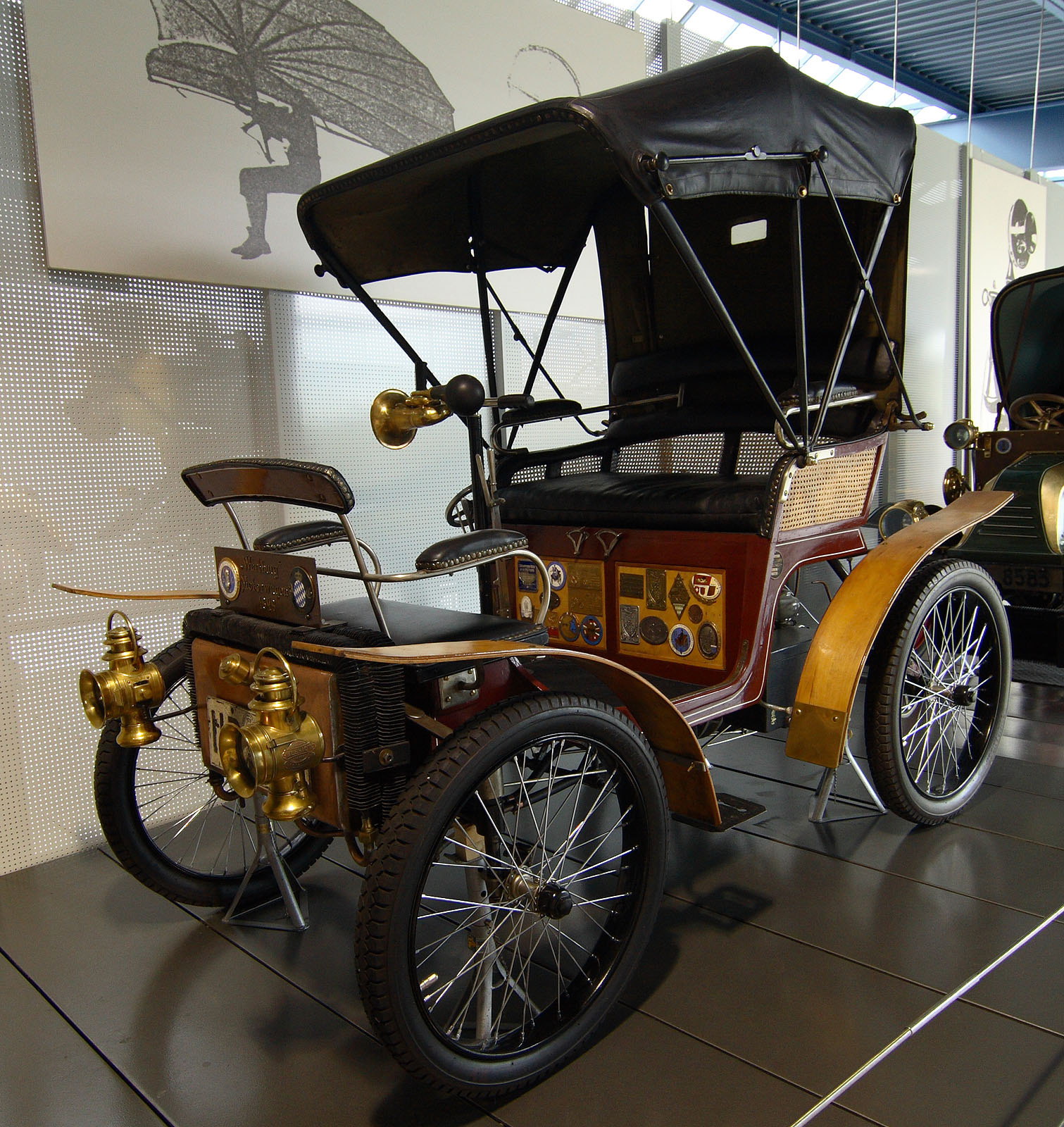
1898 Wartburg

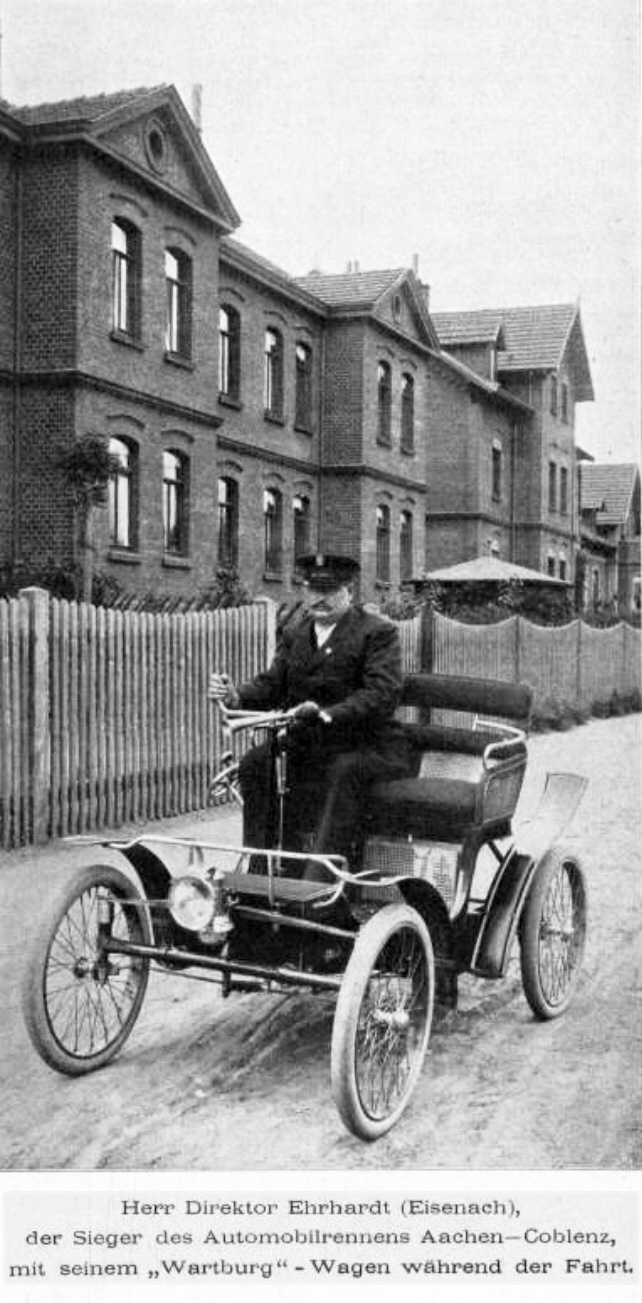
Gustav Ehrhardt in his Wartburg (1899)German caption stating: Director Ehrhardt (Eisenach), the winner of the Aachen–Coblenz automobile race, with his “Wartburg” car during the drive.

Heinrich Ehrhardt founded the Fahrzeugfabrik Eisenach (FFE) in Eisenach on 3 December 1896 as a stock company. Initially, he produced bicycles and guns. After two years, he started to produce a motor car which he called the Wartburg, a licensed model of the French Decauville. The company was the third to manufacture cars in Germany, the first being Benz & Cie and the second being Daimler Motoren Gesellschaft. His son Gustav Ehrhardt acted as chairman of the management board of the factory, which at the end of the 19th century employed 1,300 workers and was one of the largest in Thuringia.

=== Reorganized as Dixi ===
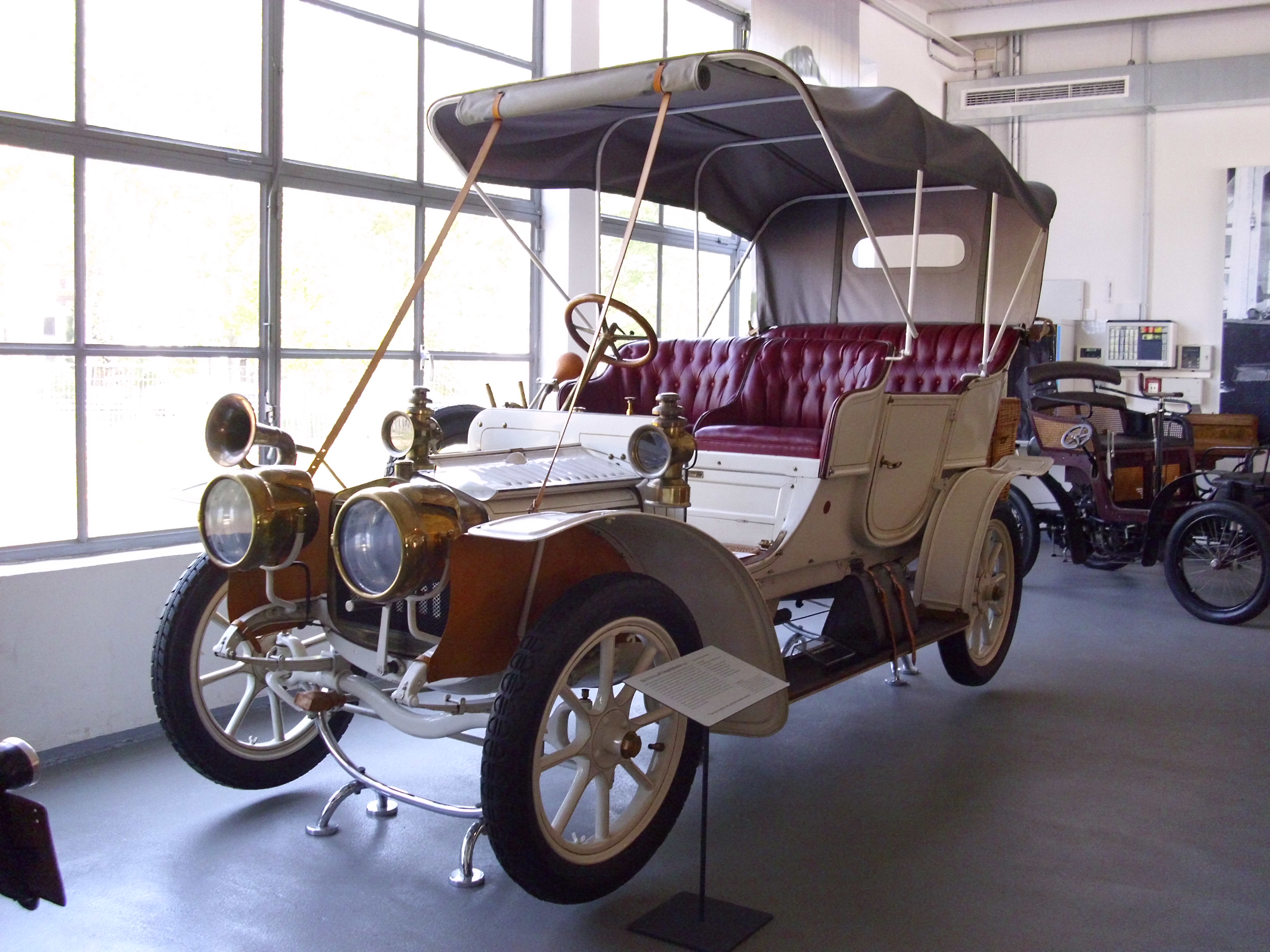
1911 Dixi tourer

In 1903, the Ehrhardt family withdrew from management due to financial losses and also because the license to build Decauvilles was revoked. The factory began building under the new name, Dixi, in 1904 with Willi Seck as chief engineer. The top model, the type U35, was introduced in 1907 and was soon recognized for its reliability and performance with 65 hp (48 kW) and a top speed of 85 km/h (53 mph).

During World War I the company produced trucks and guns. Afterwards the factory suffered from reparations with removal of equipment. In 1919, car production resumed with the company renamed as Dixi-Werke AG in 1920; but soon economic hardship forced a merger with Gothaer Waggonfabrik AG. Another result of the economic downturn was a change in output, focusing on small cars. In 1927 Dixi produced the DA-1 3/15, a version of the British Austin 7 built under licence.

=== BMW takeover ===
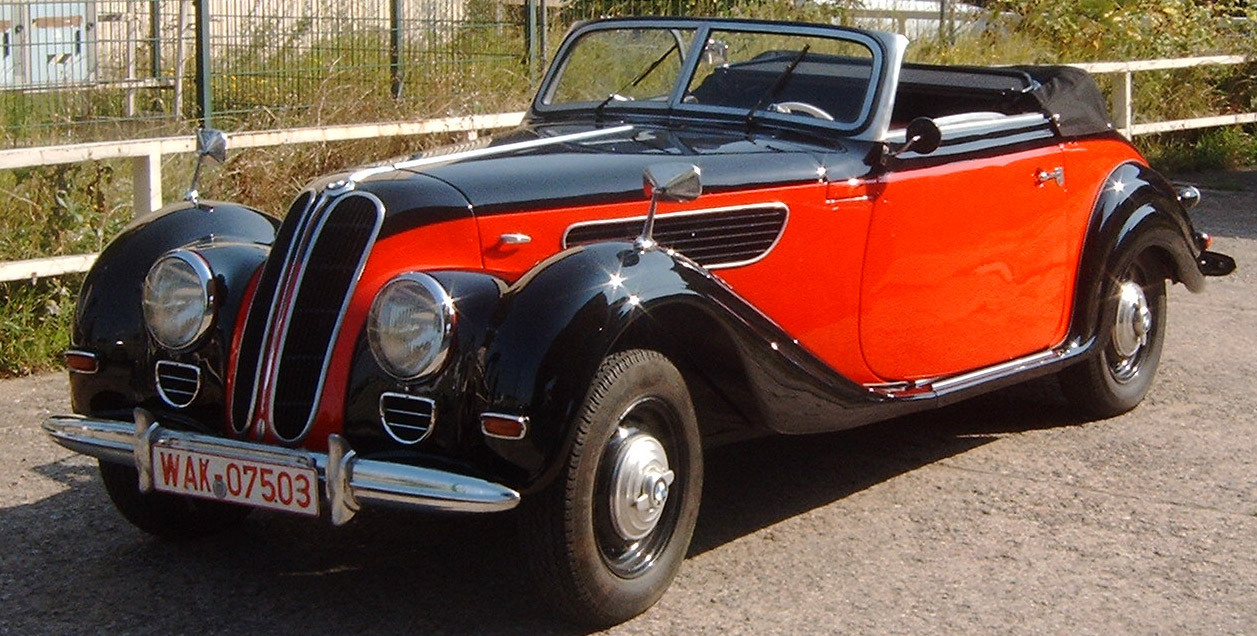
EMW/BMW 327, built in Eisenach

In November 1928 BMW acquired the Fahrzeugfabrik Eisenach A.G. (Marke "Dixi") from the Gothaer Waggonfabrik, bringing the independent existence of Dixi to an end, and the Eisenach factory became the birthplace of car manufacturing by BMW. The Dixi continued briefly as the BMW Dixi but the renamed BMW-Factory Eisenach soon started making an updated version of the car called the BMW 3/15PS dropping the Dixi name. By 1931, 25,000 cars had been produced in a series going from DA 1 to DA 4. The DA-3, a sporting version, saw a re-appearance of the Wartburg name. In 1932 a new small car, the 3/20 AM-1, was announced with independent suspension all round and an enlarged 788cc (48ci) engine.

In 1933, BMW started to develop bigger cars with 6-cylinder engines, the first car of which was the BMW 303. Later successors were the BMW 315, BMW 319, BMW 327 and the BMW 328 sports car.

In 1942 BMW moved its motorcycle production to Eisenach, freeing up space in Munich for aircraft engines. The main product was the highly successful R75. In 1942 regular automobile production was stopped because of World War II, and they started to manufacture aircraft engines for the Luftwaffe. By the end of the war about 60% of the factory had been destroyed.

=== After the War: EMW/BMW ===
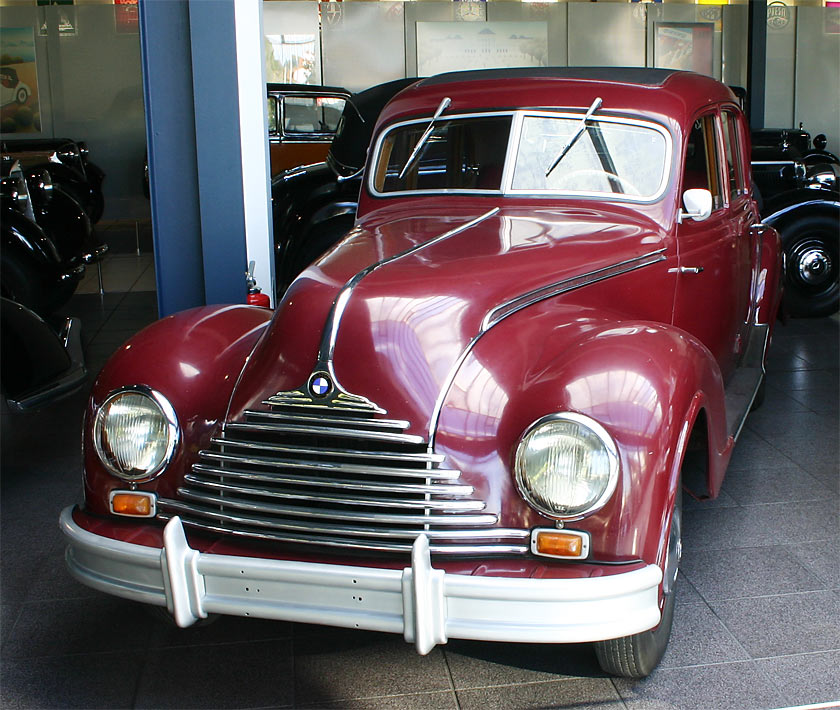
BMW 340

After the war, Thuringia was part of the Soviet sector, and the factory became a Soviet Stock company named Sowjetische AG Maschinenbau Awtowelo, Werk BMW Eisenach (Soviet Avtovelo Co., Eisenach BMW Works). Production restarted with the BMW 321, of which almost 4,000 were made between late 1945 and 1950. A number of partially completed cars had been stored in the nearby salt mines in 1941, when automobile production had been halted; these cars were completed by Awtowelo after the war. A handful of BMW 326s were made in 1946-1947, and 161 EMW 325/3s (Kübelwagen) were made in 1952. In 1949 the Eisenach works launched the BMW 340 (a development of the BMW 326 with modified front and rear bodywork) and the BMW 327. Around 150 BMW 327 were built between 1949 and 1952, when it was renamed EMW.

As long as the Soviets owned the company, BMW in Munich could not bring legal proceedings to protect its tradename. As the Munich factory was not producing cars yet, all "BMWs" made from 1945 to 1951 are Eisenach products. Initially, Awtowelo relied on pre-war stock of parts, but as production was stepped up, the company began changing over to newly manufactured parts. The new, East German parts were of inferior quality, with off-center bolts, wiring with low copper content, while the factory suffered frequent sabotage by disgruntled workers. The EMWs quickly developed a reputation for being unreliable.

In 1952 the works were transferred to ownership by the East German government and renamed EMW or Eisenacher Motorenwerk (see below). It continued type 327 production and further developed the type 340 as the EMW 340-2. Production of both models ceased in 1955, by which time Eisenach had produced a total of over 21,200 BMW/EMW 340s and 400 BMW/EMW 327s. Total production of four-stroke automobiles between 1945 and 1955 was just over 30,800.

=== VEB Automobilwerk Eisenach ===
EMW logo

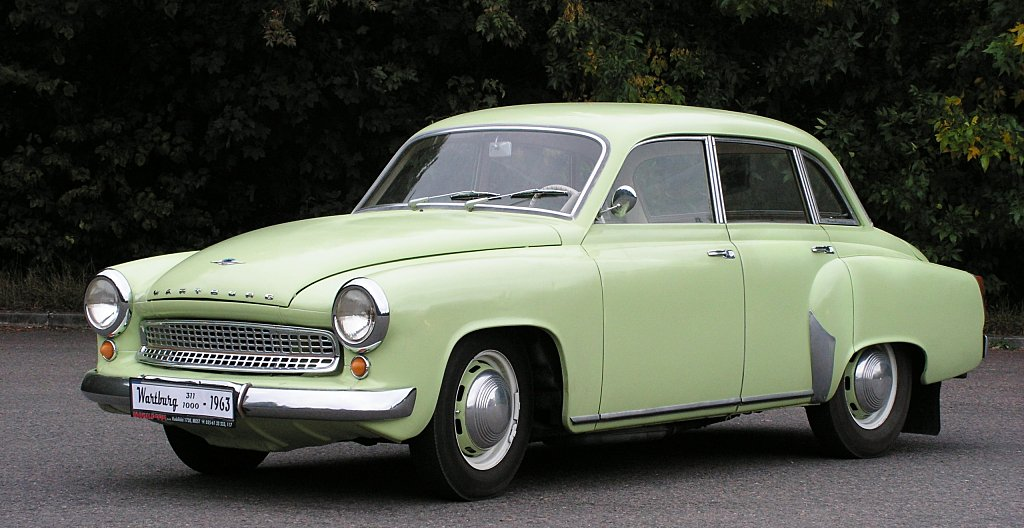
Wartburg 311

In 1945, AWE resumed production of the pre-war BMW R35 motorcycle. This became the EMW R 35 in 1952, was modified as the R35/2 and later the R35/3 with plunger rear suspension. Eisenach built just over 83,000 of the R35 and its variants before its motorcycle production ended in 1955.

In 1952, the Soviet owners handed the company over to the German Democratic Republic, and it became a state-owned company. By that time BMW from Munich was able to secure its tradename, logo, and typical double-nostril grille appearance, and started to produce cars again. The Eisenach company was renamed Eisenacher Motorenwerk (EMW), its logo being a variation of the BMW logo, the blue quadrants replaced by red ones. EMW participated in the 1953 German Grand Prix. One year later it received its final name VEB Automobilwerk Eisenach (AWE).

The first new model had a three-cylinder two-stroke engine, the IFA 309. This was based on the DKW F9 prototype that was developed in 1939, but not put into production. The manufacture of models derived from pre-war BMWs, finished at the end of 1955 (see above).

In 1956, the first Wartburg (Type 311 and later the 312) was launched with a new design, but maintaining the DKW based two-stroke engine. The Wartburg 353, introduced in 1966, received a new body, but still used the two-stroke engine, now with a displacement of 1000 cc. Many new ideas were proposed by the engineers, but they were not accepted by the state authorities. Finally, in 1988, license-built Volkswagen four-cylinder four-stroke engines were introduced.

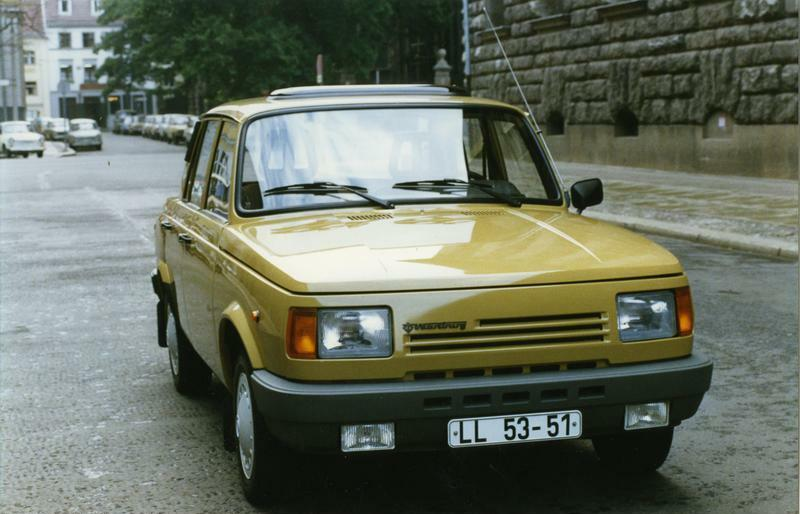
Last model Wartburg 1.3 with a four-stroke engine by Volkswagen

=== Closure after reunification ===
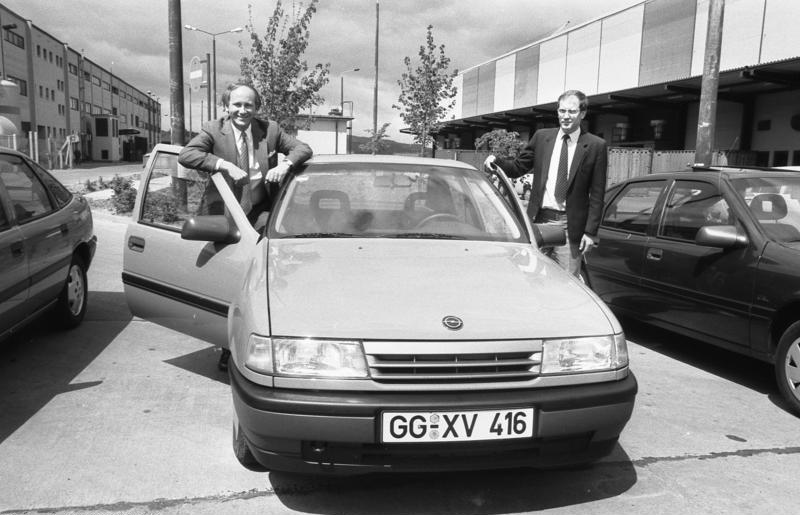
Presentation of the Opel Vectra at the (AWE) plant at Eisenach in May 1990. Assembly of the Vectra at the old Wartburg plant started five months later. One year after that the AWE plant closed, and another year later vehicle production started at Opel's new plant across the town.

The German reunification of October 1990 meant the end for AWE, as due to its obsolete labour-intensive production assets it could not compete with modern Western German plants. The cars were not competitive with western cars, either. However, locals wanted to save manufacturing jobs, and in March 1990 Adam Opel AG concluded a collaboration agreement with the plant. Things moved fast, and on 5 October 1990, AWE and Opel together opened an assembly line for the Opel Vectra. Guests at the accompanying celebrations included Helmut Kohl.

The Treuhand agency closed AWE in April 1991, but a good number of the employees found work in the newly created Opel Eisenach factory, opened in a Western Eisenach suburb in 1992.

The former production site was used by an automotive parts company Mitec Automotive until 2018. While most of the factory has been demolished, one part (Building O2) has been preserved to house the Automobile Welt Eisenach, a museum to document the history of AWE.

== Production table for cars manufactured 1898–1991 ==
Time period	Model	Production (Cars)
1898–1903	Wartburg-Motorwagen	ca. 250
1904–1927	Dixi-PKW	6,090
1907–1927	Dixi-LKW	2,622
1907–1928	Dixi-Kleinwagen DA 1	9,308
1929–1943	BMW DA 2, DA 3, DA 4, BMW 303, 309, 315, 319, 319/1, 329, 320, 321, 325, 326, 327, 328, 335	78,768
1945–1946	BMW 326 (post WWII)	16
1945–1950	BMW 321 (post WWII)	8,996
1945–1955	BMW, since 1952 EMW 327-1, 327-2, 327-3 (post WWII)	505
1949–1955	BMW, since 1952 EMW 340, 340-1, 340-2	21,083
1952	Kübelwagen IFA EMW 325-3	166
1953–1956	IFA F9	38,782
1956–1965	Wartburg 311/312	258,928
1957–1960	Wartburg-Sport 313-1	469
1965–1966	Wartburg 312-1	33,759
1966–1975	Wartburg 353	356,330
1975–1990	Wartburg 353 W	868,860
1988–1991	Wartburg 1.3	152,775
Total production		1,837,708

== See also ==
- AWE racing car
- BMW
- Opel Eisenach
- Volkseigener Betrieb
