= Automobile Welt Eisenach =

Stiftung Automobile Welt Eisenach (awe)

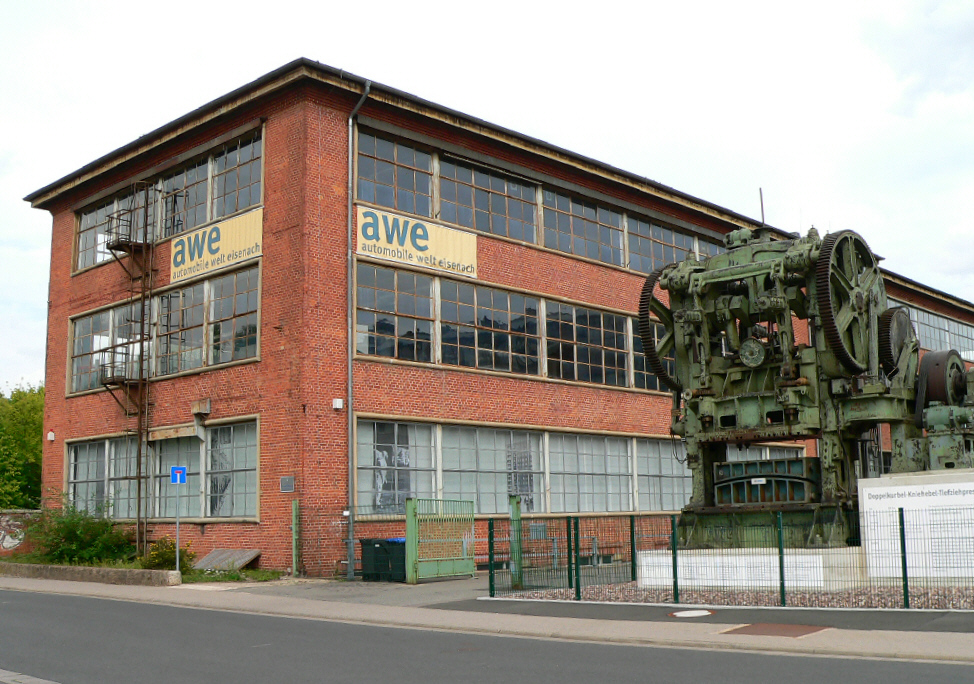
- Established: 4 June 2005; 21 years ago
- Location: Friedrich-Naumann-Straße 10, 99817 Eisenach
- Coordinates: 50°58′52″N 10°19′30″E
- Type: Car museum
- Website: www.awe-stiftung.de

Automobile Welt Eisenach is a car museum located in the old East German town of Eisenach adjacent to the banks of the Hörsel river. It is situated on the old Automobilwerk Eisenach factory site, one of the world's oldest, and opened as a museum in 2005 utilising building O2 from 1935.

== Exhibits ==
The museum chronicles the history of car manufacturing in Eisenach from 1899, through the Dixi and BMW pre-war years, and the development of the German Democratic Republic car industry with EMW, IFA and Wartburg, and the post-unification Opel models.

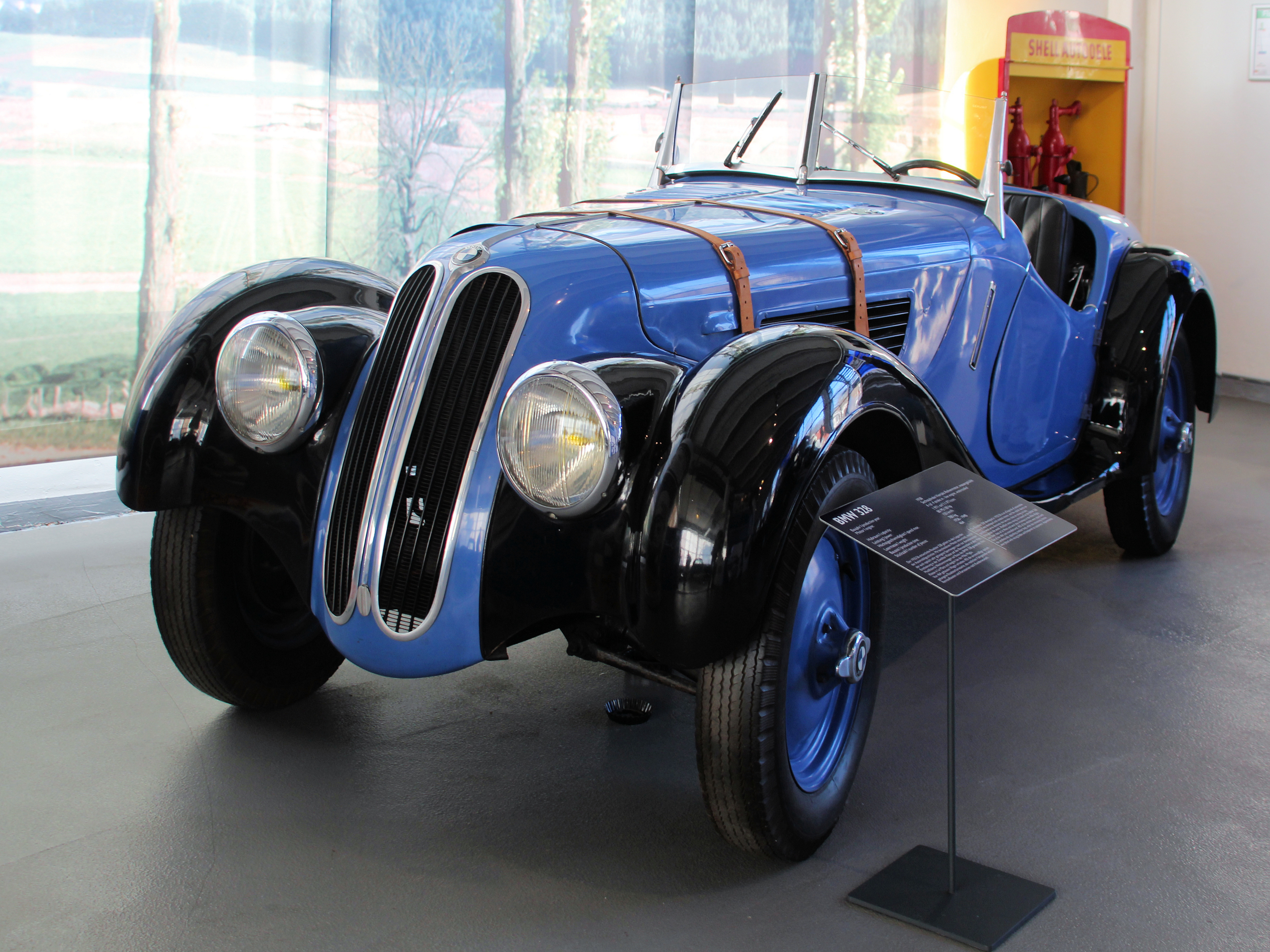

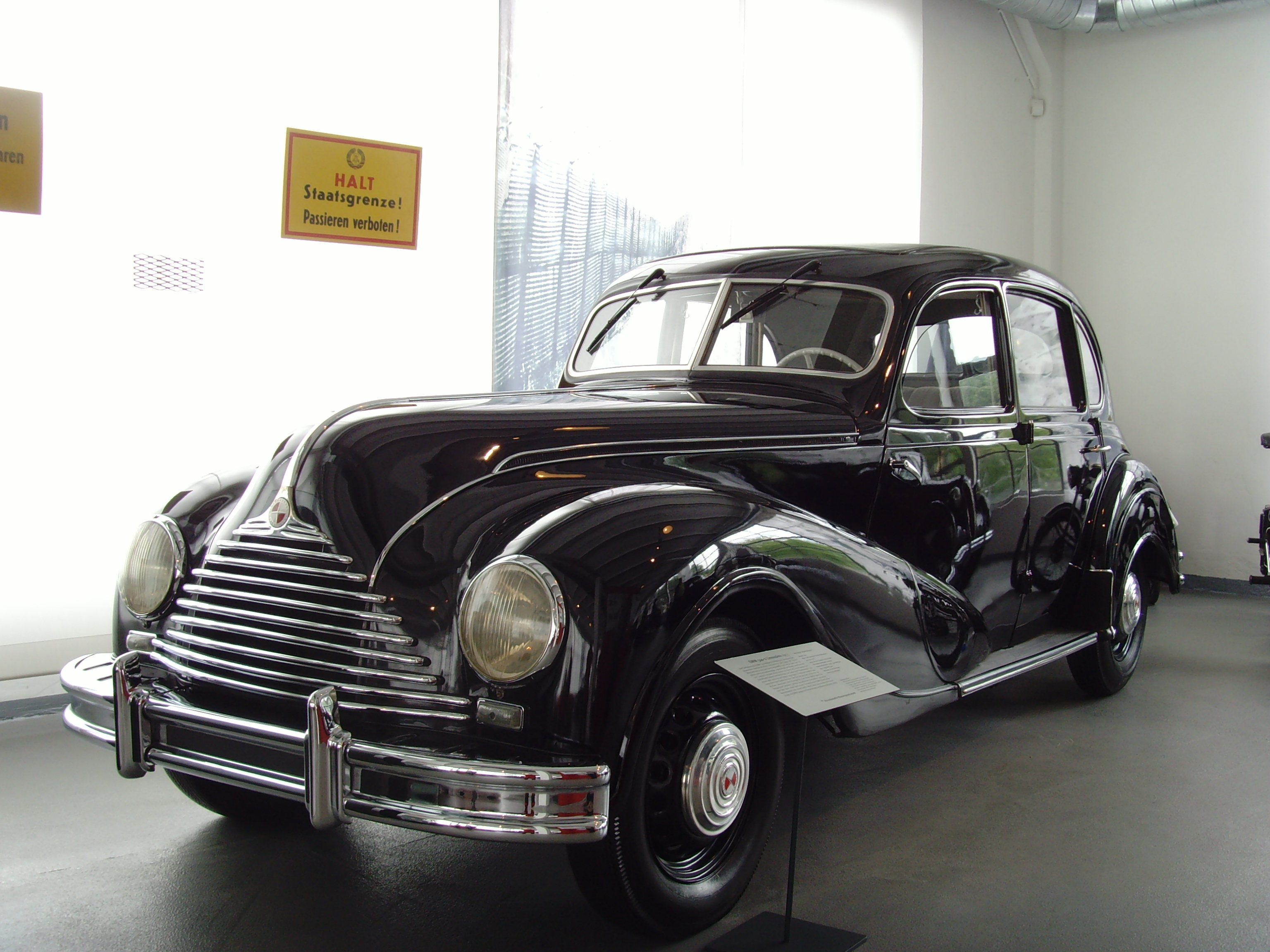

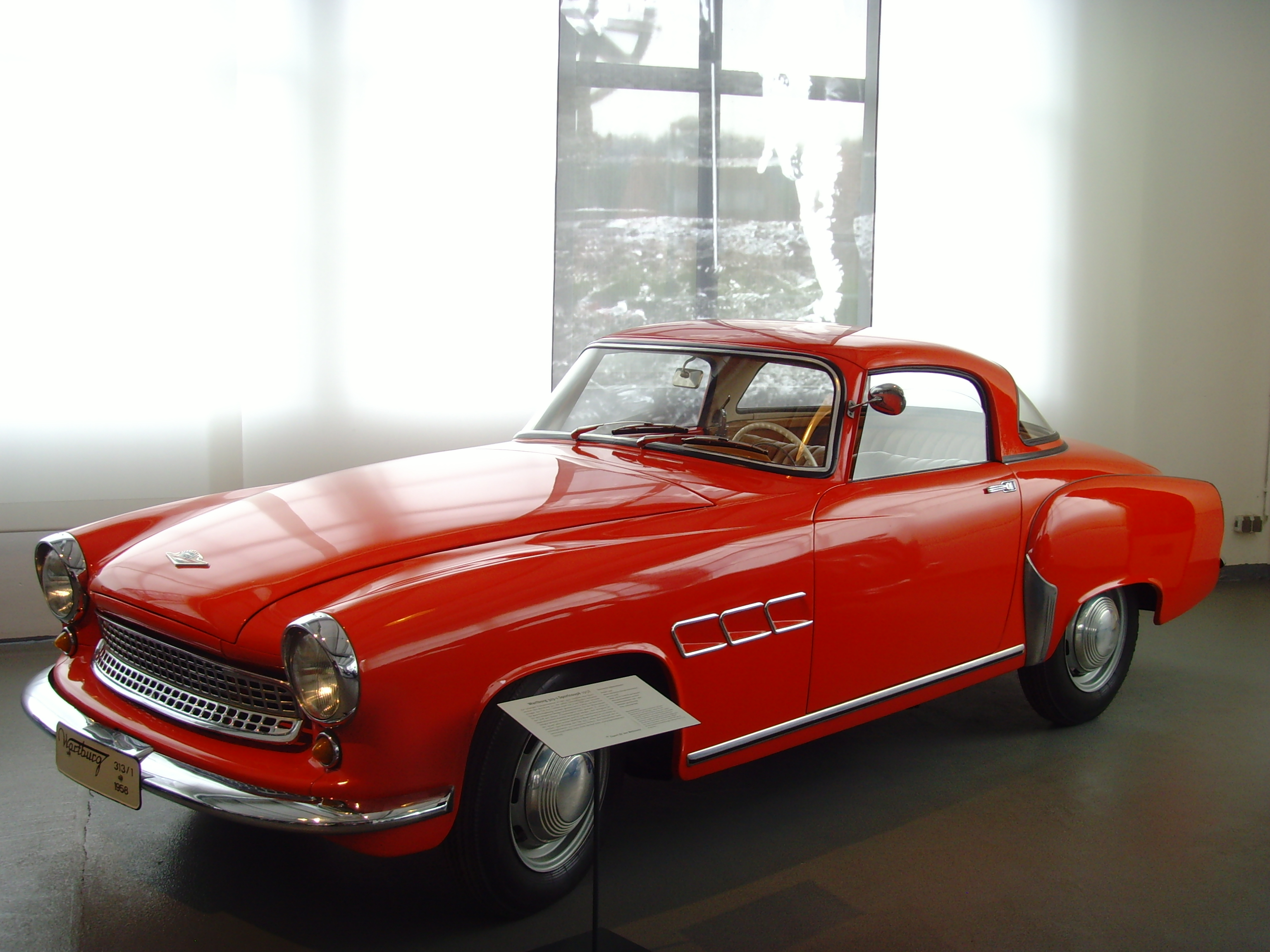

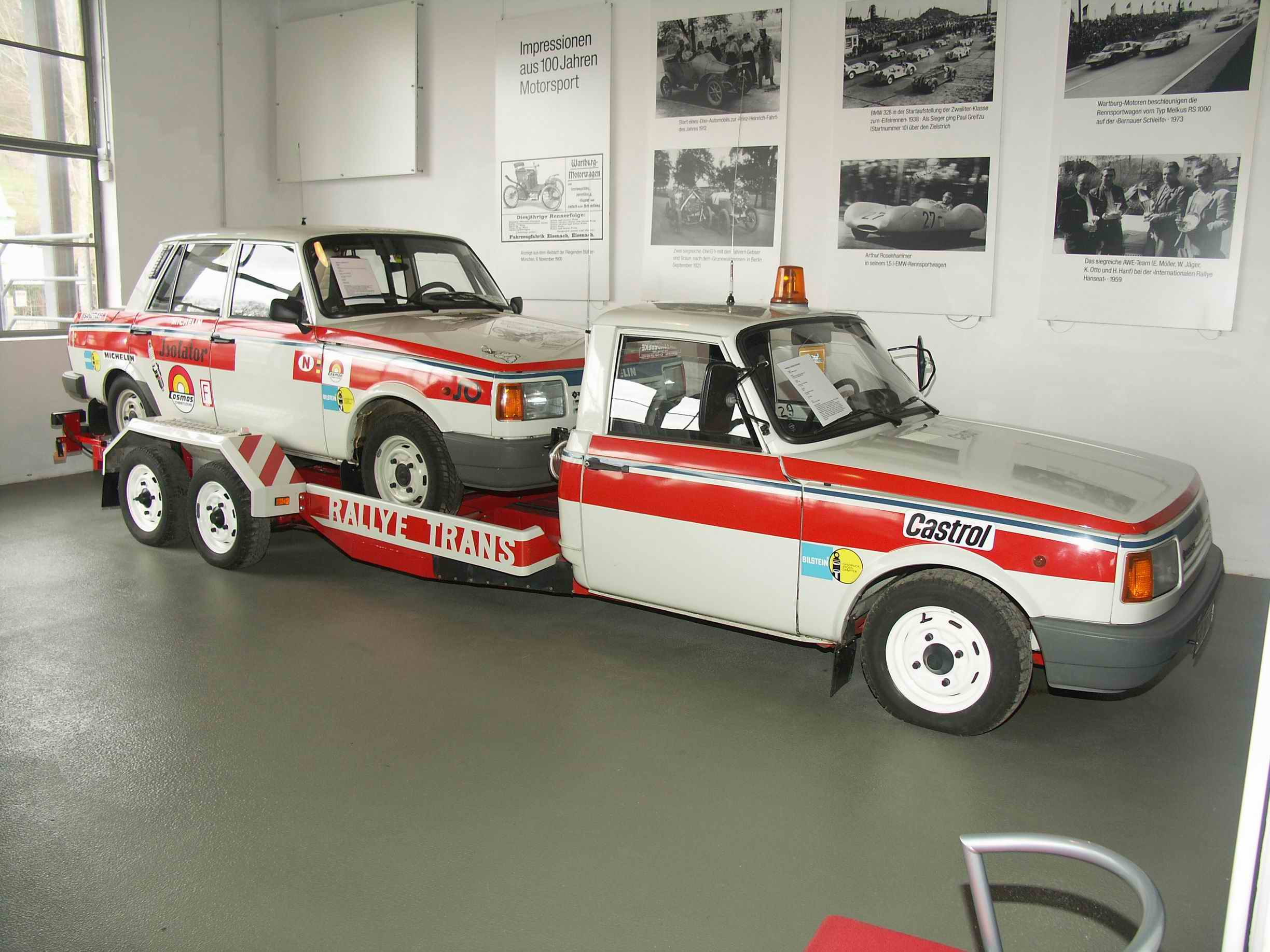
