= AWE racing car =

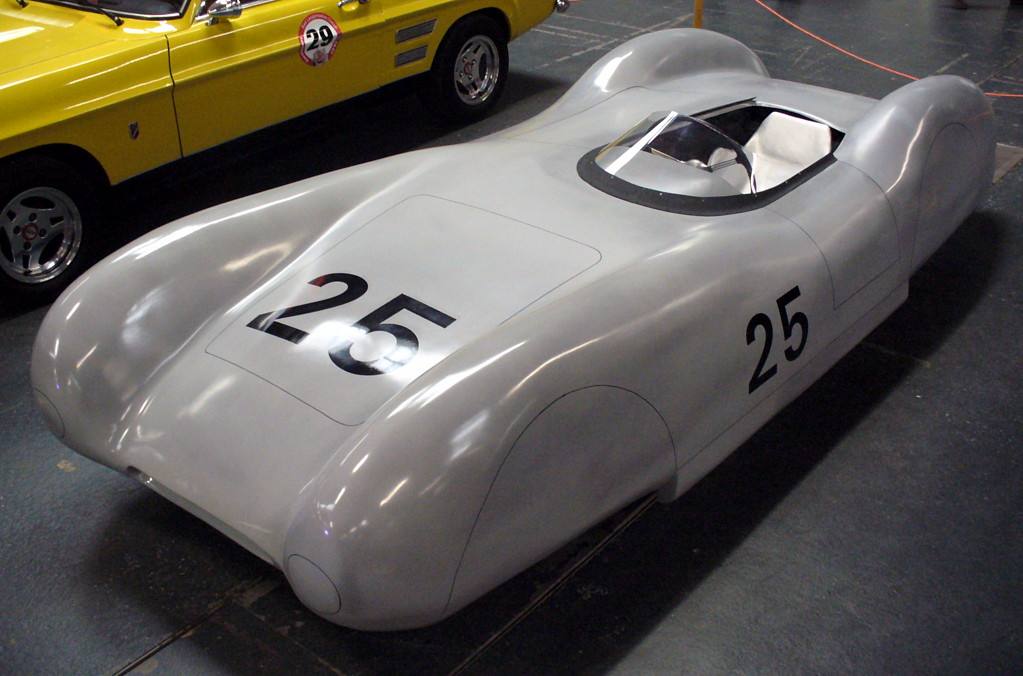
AWE Rennsportwagen

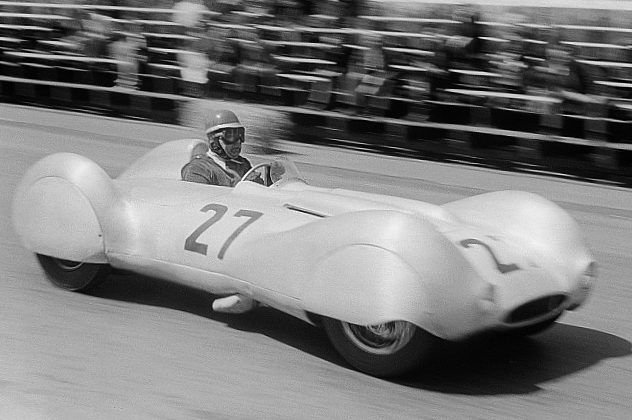
Arthur Rosenhammer in an EMW racing car (1954)

The AWE racing cars (known as EMW racing cars until the end of 1955) were a series of racing cars that were constructed between 1953 and 1955 in the Eisenach automobile plant by the EMW/AWE racing collective based there and used in national and international races from 1954 to 1956.

== History ==
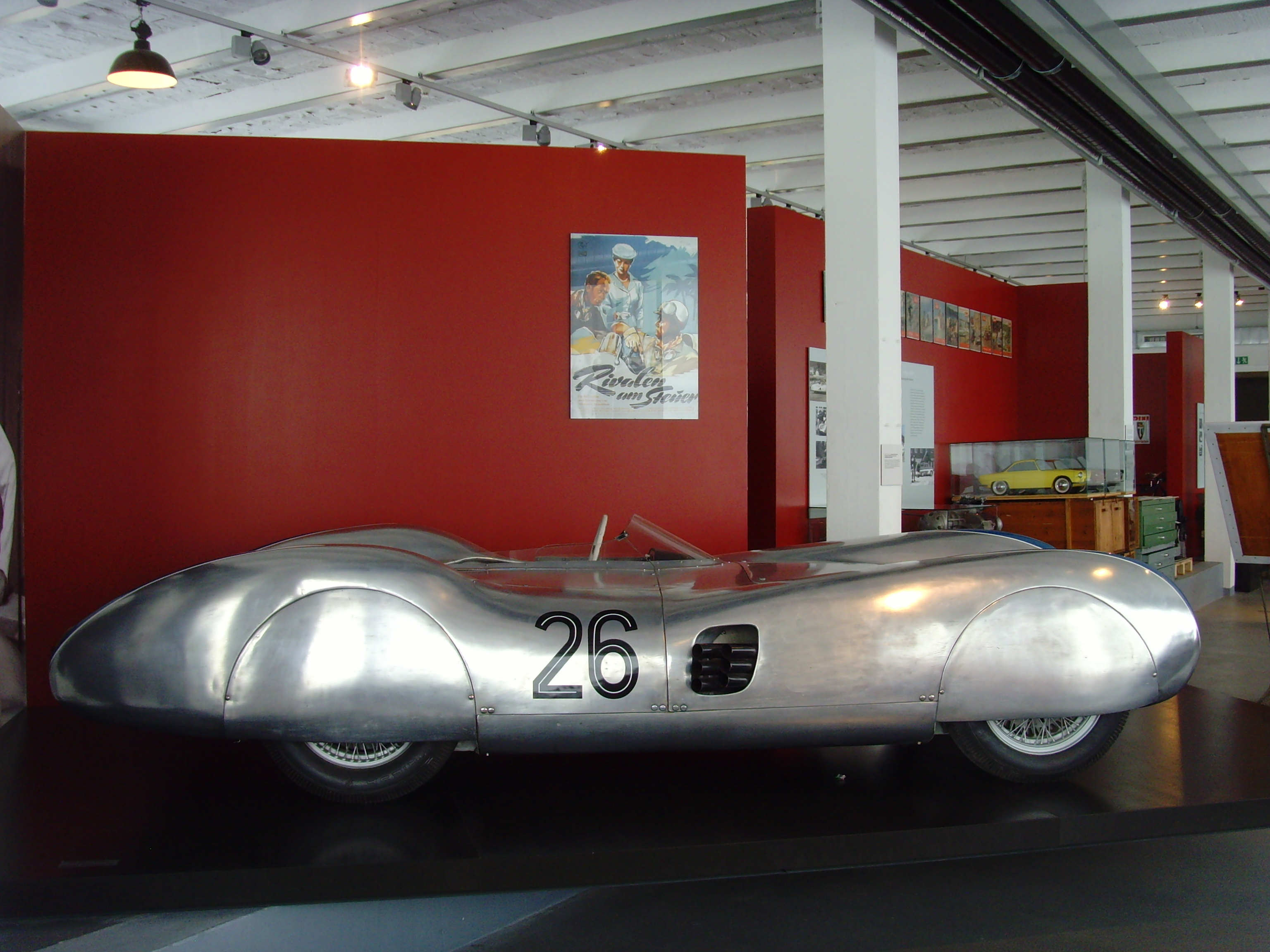
1.5-liter racing sports car, Bj. 1954

At the beginning of 1951, the GDR government commissioned a group of vehicle designers, initially under the direction of Ernst Ring and later under the direction of Arthur Rosenhammer, to set up a racing team in the DAMW 's testing and testing office in Berlin-Johannisthal and on the basis of the BMW manufactured in Eisenach 328 to construct a competitive racing car in order to prove the efficiency of the socialist industry in street racing. In 1952, the R1 racing sports car developed from the BMW model achieved a victory on the AVUS 1952. After the end of the 1952 racing season, the 1953 racing collective was relocated to the Eisenach engine works there and continued as the EMW racing collective, which for the upcoming 1953 racing season took over the vehicles from Johannisthal and the four from 1950 from the Eisenach BMW works based on the BMW 328 and its successor, the BMW 340, had available racing cars. The material brought from Johannisthal was worn out and it was foreseeable that the vehicles would no longer be competitive in the new season. The collective, which was heavily reshuffled after the move, began developing a new 1.5-liter racing car as early as possible. The racing team contested the 1953 racing season with further developed vehicles that had been taken over from Johannisthal. Edgar Barth drove one of these cars for the EMW racing collective at the 1953 German Grand Prix at the Nürburgring. It was the only time that a GDR racing team took part in a race for the Automobile World Championship.

== New development for 1954 ==
The racing collective wanted to start the 1954 racing season with completely newly designed, streamlined racing vehicles. A new engine was also developed for this, which for the first time was no longer based on the engine of the BMW 328.

=== Engine ===
The basis of the new racing sports car was the newly developed racing engine, a six-cylinder, four-stroke in-line engine made of light alloy with two overhead camshafts, two valves per cylinder actuated by rocker arms, and dual ignition with two spark plugs per cylinder. The engine made 138 hp at 7000 min -1 with a displacement of 1498 cubic centimeters. The intake ports were straight and, with three double flat-flow carburetors, ensured optimal mixture preparation for the OZ 90 fuel prescribed at the time. Initially, a crankshaft running in four multi-material plain bearings was used, which was later replaced by a roller-bearing shaft with Hirth gearing. If necessary, an oil cooler could be switched on.

=== EMW 1500 ===
Construction of the new racing cars began in the winter of 1953/54. In addition to the newly developed engine, the chassis, the front axle with independent wheel suspension, and the rear axle based on the De Dion principle, each with torsion bar suspension, were also new designs. The 280mm drum brakes were carried over from the EMW 340-2 but had improved heat dissipation. The dual-circuit brake system was divided into front and rear axles; the fuel tank integrated into the second driver's seat had a capacity of 90 liters. Because of this tank arrangement, there was only one door. From the predecessor, only the wire-spoke wheels with serrations and quick-release hubs were taken over, which were covered by the streamlined fairing on the new cars.

Since the planned four new vehicles were not completely ready at the start of the season, the collective started with just one new vehicle at the start of the season on May 16, 1954, in Leipzig. Arthur Rosenhammer, as the collective's most experienced driver, was given the task of driving this car. The second car was ready for the Eifel race on May 23 at the Nürburgring and was driven by Edgar Barth.

After Rosenhammer was able to take first place in the first race in Leipzig, he retired at the Nürburgring with a damaged clutch, Barth finished tenth. In August 1954, Rosenhammer and Barth competed once more at the Nürburgring, this time for the German Grand Prix, a sports car race supporting the 1954 European Grand Prix, in which Barth finished sixth and Rosenhammer retired again, this time already in practice with a gearbox failure. Paul Thiel took an impressive twelfth place with the last year's vehicle. On September 19 at the AVUSBarth and Thiel finished fourth and seventh, Rosenhammer's vehicle caught fire after the fuel line broke, so he had to retire. Also in the following races in Dresden and Bernau, no victories could be achieved.

On December 3, 1954, Arthur Rosenhammer scored with the 1.5-liter racing sports car on the Dessau racetrack on December 3, 1954, Arthur Rosenhammer achieved a world speed record of 10 miles with an average speed of 229.5 km/h.

=== EMW R3/55 ===
During the 1954/55 winter break, four more vehicles were designed, with targeted improvements to the chassis, steering, brakes, and bodywork based on the experience of the 1954 season.

All four new vehicles were ready for use at the start of the season on May 15, 1955, in Dessau. In addition to Barth, Rosenhammer, and Thiel, Egon Binner was signed as a driver. Barth, Rosenhammer, and Thiel achieved a triple victory in front of Ernst Lautenschläger on one Porsche.

Edgar Barth and Paul Thiel also achieved a highly regarded result in the 1955 Eifel race at the Nürburgring. Edgar Barth won the sports car class up to 1.5 liters in the ten-lap (228.10 km) race in a time of 1:53:19.6 hours or an average of 120.8 km/h ahead of his teammate Thiel and Wolfgang Seidel in a Porsche 550. In practice, Barth drove the fastest lap of the sports cars with a displacement of up to 1.5 liters in 10:39.1 minutes or 128.5 km/h, 16.5 seconds faster than Richard von Frankenberg Lap record from the previous year on a Porsche 550. the Leipzig city park race, the EMW drivers occupied places one to four, and Rosenhammer managed a third place at the AVUS.

At the turn of the season in 1955/56, the EMW racing collective was renamed the AWE racing collective, after the Eisenach engine works had been operating as the Automobile Works in Eisenach since 1954. On April 29, 1956, Rosenhammer and Barth entered their 1955 AWE racing car in the Paris Grand Prix in the French capital, finishing third and fourth. At the start of the season in the two German states, the vehicles were technically overhauled again, including a five-speed gearbox and an optimization of the engines.

At the ADAC 1000 km race on May 27, 1956, at the Nürburgring, for which 61 cars were registered and 57 competed, the AWE racing collective started with two vehicles. To increase reliability and survive the 44 laps, the team reduced engine power; but nevertheless, Paul Thiel/Egon Binner dropped out on lap 29 with an engine failure. The Edgar Barth/Arthur Rosenhammer team with starting number 26, on the other hand, finished seventh in the overall classification and finished third in the sports car class up to 1500 cm^{3}, one lap down, behind the Porsche 550 RS driven by Wolfgang von Trips/Umberto Maglioli and Richard von Frankenberg/Hans Herrmann. Barth/Rosenhammer completed 43 laps or 980.83 km in 8:05:54.2 hours; this corresponds to an average speed of 121.1 km/h. The winners' Moss/Behra/Taruffi/Schell Maserati 300S with a 3-liter engine drove an average of 129.8 km/h.

The last encounter with the racing drivers from Porsche took place on September 16, 1956, at the AVUS, where AWE took third and fourth place after Porsche. The racing collective started for the last time on September 23, 1956, in Dessau in a race in which the West German competition did not take part. Barth won ahead of Rosenhammer and Thiel. After the 1956 season, the development of racing vehicles at the Eisenach automobile plant was stopped and the racing collective was dissolved in April 1957. Edgar Barth then switched to Porsche in West Germany in 1957.

== Specifications of the EMW R3/55 ==
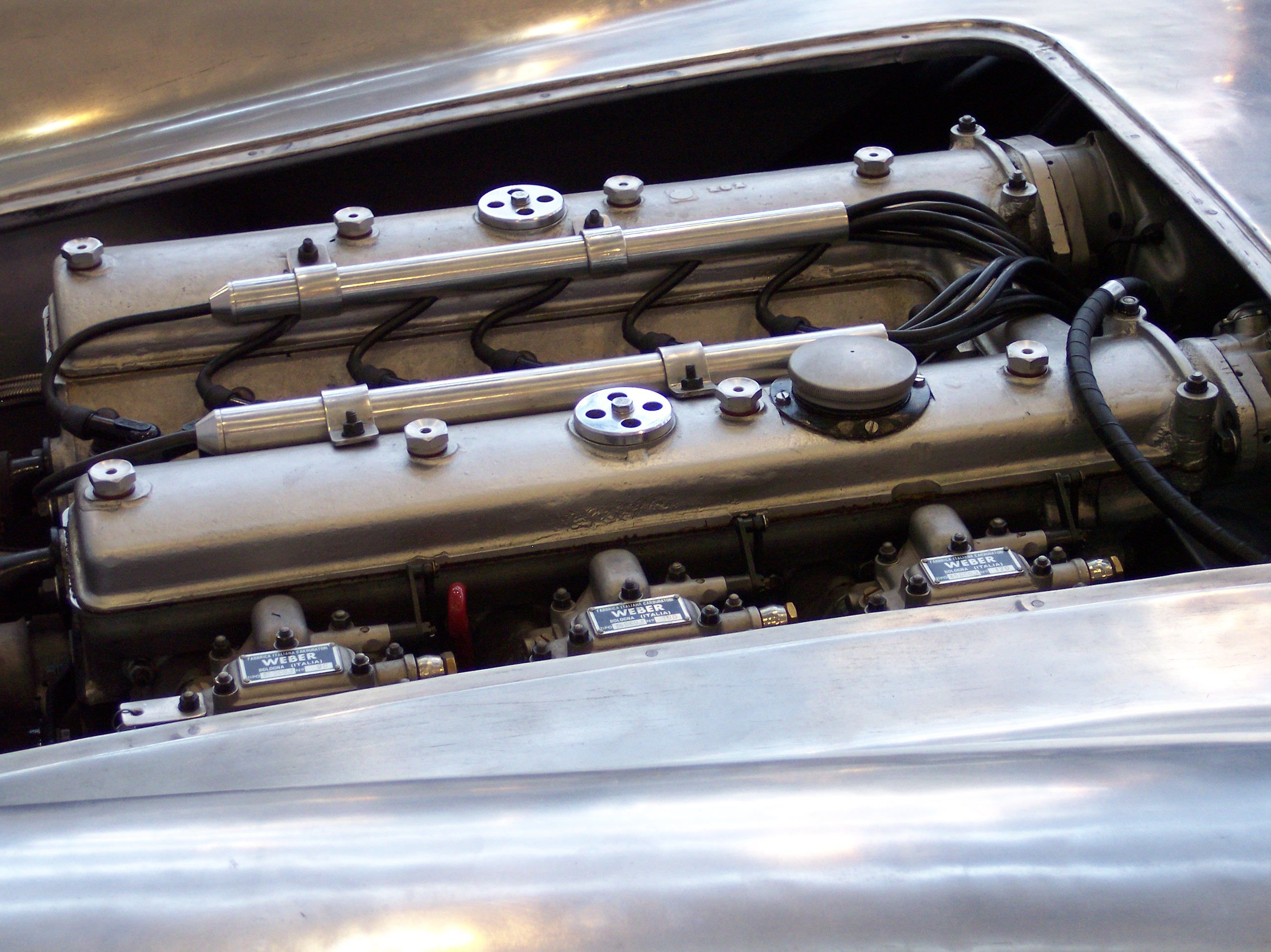
Der EMW 1,5-Liter-Rennmotor

=== Parameters - Dates (1954/55) ===
- Engine: 6-cylinder in-line engine
- Bore × Stroke: 66 mm (2.6 in)×73 mm (2.9 in)
- Displacement: 1,498 cc (91 cu in)
- Compression: 9.5:1
- Mixture preparation: three double flat-draft carburetors
- Ignition: dual ignition
- Power: 138 hp (101 kW) @ 7000 rpm
- Max. Torque: 142 N⋅m (105 lb⋅ft) @ 5500 rpm
- Crankshaft: stored fourfold
- Engine control: two valves per cylinder, actuated by rocker arms, two overhead camshafts, driven by straight-toothed spur gears
- Fuel: OZ 90
- Tank capacity: 90 L (24 US gal)
- Cooling water: (about 12 L (3.2 US gal))
- Coupling: double disc clutch
- Transmission: 4-speed manual transmission, driven via Cardan shaft to the rear axle, self-locking differential gear
- Frame and body: Trellis frame and aluminum body
- Front suspension: Independent wheel suspension on two wishbones of different lengths, longitudinal torsion bar springs, acting on the upper wishbones, sloping telescopic shock absorbers between the lower wishbones and frame cross member
- Rear suspension: De Dion axle with upper triangular link, suspension via longitudinal torsion bar springs and crank arms, sloping telescopic shock absorbers
- Brakes: Hydraulically operated dual-circuit duplex brake, acting separately on front and rear wheels, brake drums with cooling fins, Ø 280 mm (11 in)
- Wheelbase: 2,150 mm (85 in)
- Track: 1,000 mm (39 in)/1,170 mm (46 in)
- Dry weight: about 500 kg (1,100 lb)
- Top speed: approx. 235 km/h (146 mph)

== Whereabouts of vehicles ==
At least five of the eight vehicles built between 1953 and 1955 still exist. One of them can be seen in the Automobile World Museum in Eisenach, two were given to the Dresden Transport Museum after the dissolution of the racing collective. At least two other vehicles are privately owned.

== Trivia ==
The racing collective and its vehicles formed the background for the 1956 DEFA feature film Rivals at the wheel, which shows the vehicles in action. The film is about a fictional racing driver who decides to work in the EMW racing collective rather than pursue a career in West Germany. The drivers of the collective took part in the film as drivers of racing cars and extras.
