= Eisenacher Motorenwerk =

German automobile manufacturer and Formula One constructor

- Formerly: BMW
- Industry: Automobile and motorcycle manufacture
- Founded: c. 1945 Eisenach, East Germany
- Defunct: During the 1950s
- Successor: BMW; Opel Eisenach (factory)
- Headquarters: Eisenach
- Products: Automobiles; Motorcycles

Eisenacher Motorenwerk (EMW) was an East German manufacturer of automobiles and motorcycles based in Eisenach. EMW also entered Formula One as a constructor in 1953, but participated in only one race, the 1953 German Grand Prix. The car retired after 12 laps with exhaust problems.

== Continuing BMW production ==
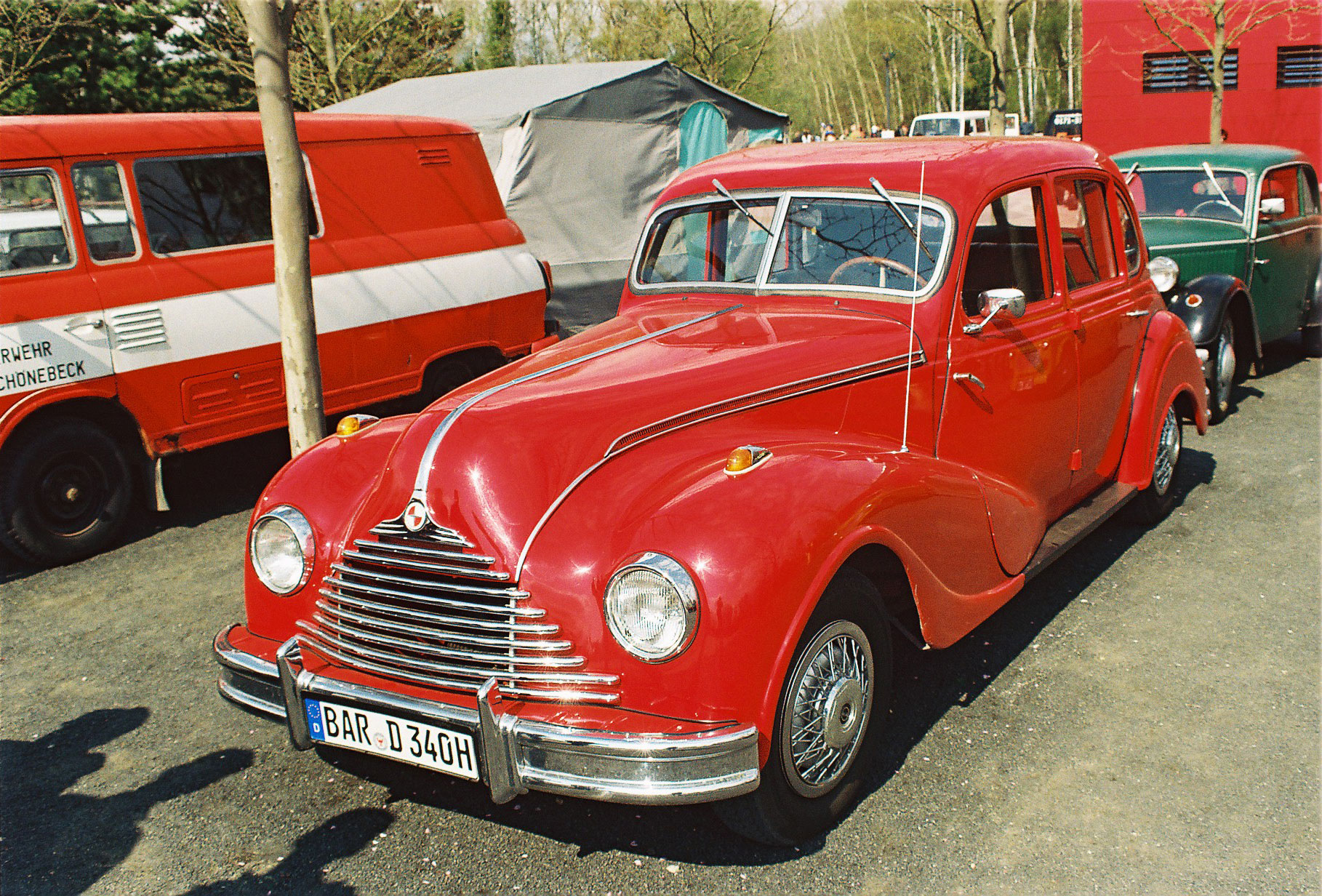
1952-1955 EMW 340, with a redesigned grille

One of the pre-World War II BMW factories was located in Eisenach, which was initially occupied by American forces in April 1945. It had already been agreed between the allies that the whole of Thuringia would fall within the Soviet occupation zone: transfer of the region to the Soviets took place in July 1945. The tooling for BMW's manufacturing facility had been hidden in nearby mines during the war, but the entire operations were intended to be crated up and taken by rail to the Soviet Union as part of the substantial post war reparations package. Initially, the plant focused on making cooking pots and wheelbarrows and the like, but surviving workers returning from the war recommenced automobile production on a small scale, using prewar designs and depending on existing parts stocks. Albert Seidler, the man in charge of Eisenach motor bike production, had a brand new BMW 321 (with red seats) assembled and presented it to Marshal Georgy Zhukov. The Russians were evidently impressed, and agreed to halt dismantling the plant if the workers were able to assemble five more cars in one week. Zhukov issued order no. 93 in October 1945, agreeing to have finished cars sent to the Soviet Union as part of the reparations package rather than the plant itself. Ten cars and 23 motorcycles were completed that very month. The plant then passed under the control of "Sowjetische AG Maschinenbau Awtowelo", a Soviet directed holding company focused on vehicle production.

Initial production was reserved for Soviet and government use; production for civilian use and commercial exports commenced in 1948. The factory continued producing cars and motorcycles under the BMW brand, but after a lawsuit in 1952 they had to change the name to EMW instead. The logotype was also similar, but instead of the blue used by BMW (representing the flag of Bavaria), EMW used red, for the Communist red flag.

The Kasernierte Volkspolizei (a paramilitary police branch which preceded the National People's Army) and the succeeding East German armed forces needed vehicles and expressed interest in reviving production of the BMW 325, an unsuccessful wartime off-road Einheits-PKW (standardized military light utility vehicle) built by BMW in Eisenach. This was developed into the new EMW 325/3, of which 166 were built in 1952. This remilitarization, however, violated the terms of the Potsdam Conference and led to protests from the West.

== New designs ==
Later the automobile section of EMW became VEB Automobilwerk Eisenach and built the Wartburg. Motorcycle manufacture ended in the 1950s and was replaced by the AWO 425 built by Simson at Suhl.

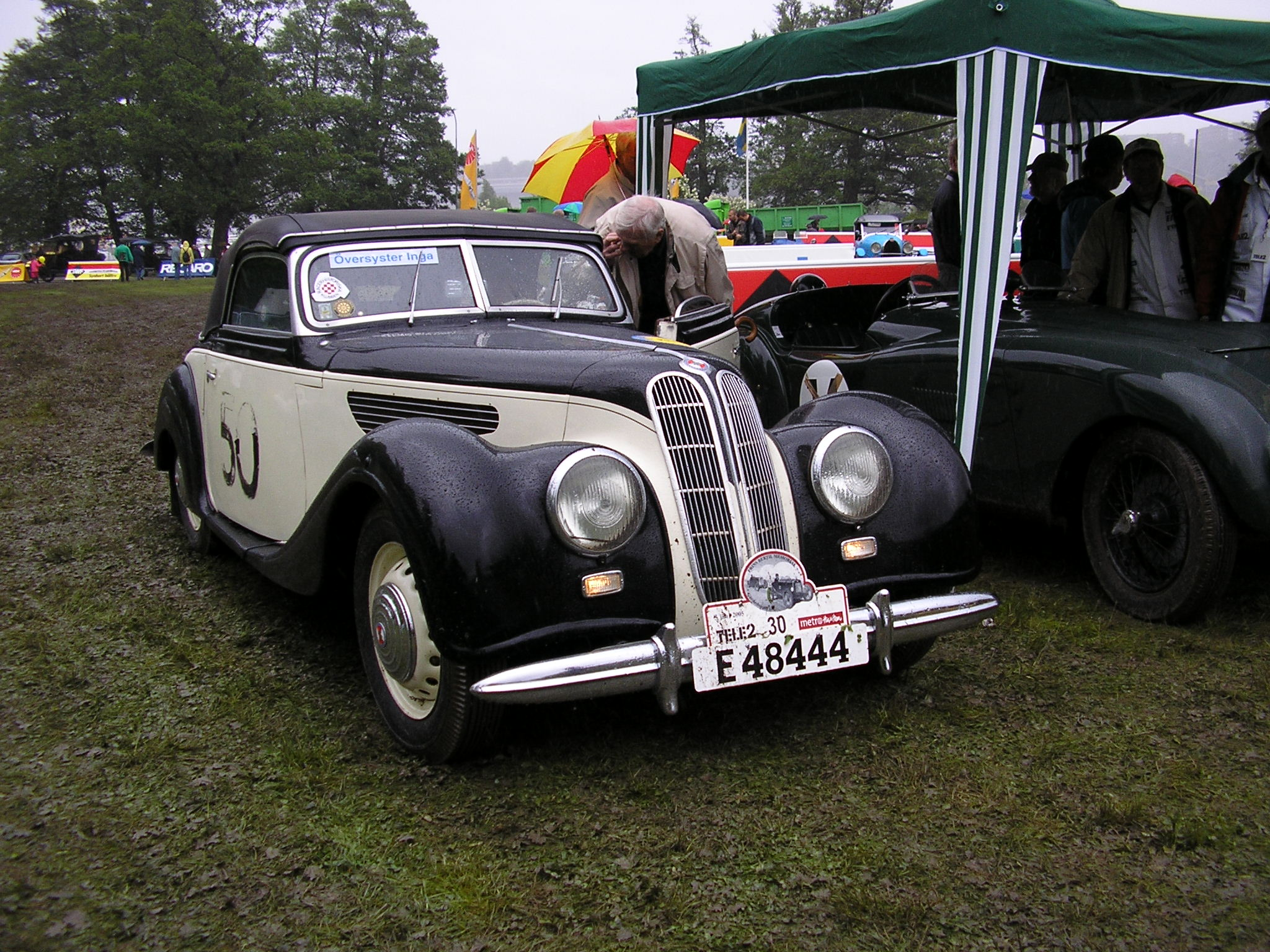
An EMW. Note the BMW-like grille.

== Complete Formula One World Championship results ==
EMW as a Formula One chassis constructor
- Official name(s): Eisenacher Motorenwerk
- Base: Eisenach, East Germany

Formula One World Championship career
- Engines: EMW 2.0l L6
- Entrants: Rennkollektiv EMW
- First entry: 1953 German Grand Prix
- Last entry: 1953 German Grand Prix
- Races entered: 1
- Race victories: 0
- Constructors' Championships: 0
- Drivers' Championships: 0
- Pole positions: 0
- Fastest laps: 0

(key)

Year	Chassis	Engine	Tyres	Driver	1	2	3	4	5	6	7	8	9	Points	WCC
1953	EMW R2	EMW L6	D		ARG	500	NED	BEL	FRA	GBR	GER	SUI	ITA	n/a^{*}	n/a^{*}
1953	EMW R2	EMW L6	D	(East Germany) Edgar Barth							Ret			n/a^{*}	n/a^{*}

* Constructors' Championship not awarded until 1958.
