= Zella-Mehlis =

- Town
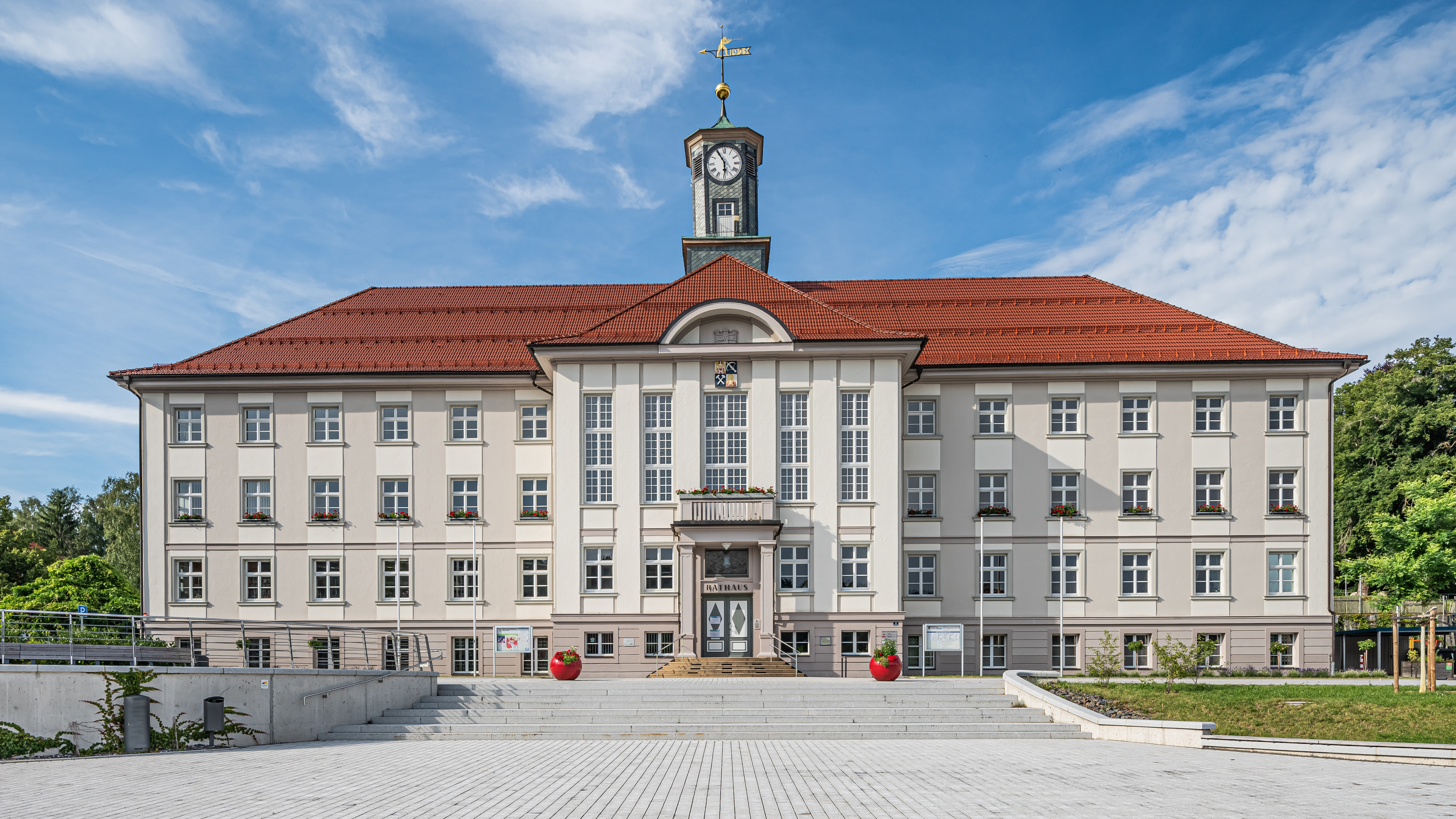
- Town hall

- Coat of arms

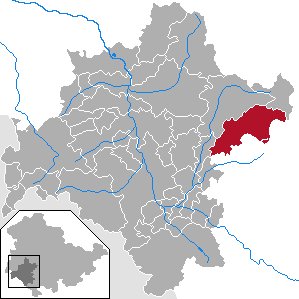
- Location of Zella-Mehlis within Schmalkalden-Meiningen district
- Interactive map of Zella-Mehlis
- Location within Germany Location within Thuringia
- Coordinates: 50°39′35″N 10°40′1″E
- Country: Germany
- State: Thuringia
- District: Schmalkalden-Meiningen

Government
  - Mayor (2024–30): Torsten Widder

Area
  - Total: 52.99 km^{2} (20.46 sq mi)
- Elevation: 500 m (1,600 ft)

Population (2025-12-31)
  - Total: 12,157
  - Density: 229.4/km^{2} (594.2/sq mi)
- Time zone: UTC+01:00 (CET)
  - Summer (DST): UTC+02:00 (CEST)
- Postal codes: 98544
- Dialling codes: 03682
- Vehicle registration: SM
- Website: www.zella-mehlis.de

Zella-Mehlis (German pronunciation: [ˈtsɛla ˈmeːlɪs]) is a town in the Schmalkalden-Meiningen district of Thuringia, Germany. It is situated in the Thuringian Forest, approximately 5 km north of Suhl and 20 km east of Meiningen.

== History ==
Two of Germany's most notable firearm manufacturers, Walther and Anschütz, were founded in Zella-Mehlis. They operated there until the Soviet occupation of Eastern Germany at the conclusion of World War II caused both companies to move.

In January 2019, the former municipality of Benshausen was integrated into Zella-Mehlis, expanding the town's jurisdiction.

== Historical population ==
Historical population

Year	Pop.	±% p.a.
1946	17,352	—
1950	16,914	−0.64%
1960	16,370	−0.33%
1981	14,444	−0.59%
1984	13,921	−1.22%
1994	13,401	−0.38%
1995	13,100	−2.25%
1996	12,990	−0.84%
1997	12,941	−0.38%
1998	12,933	−0.06%
1999	13,206	+2.11%
2000	13,036	−1.29%
2001	12,961	−0.58%
2002	12,726	−1.81%
2003	12,544	−1.43%
2004	12,495	−0.39%

Year	Pop.	±% p.a.
2005	12,245	−2.00%
2006	12,095	−1.22%
2007	11,951	−1.19%
2008	11,910	−0.34%
2009	11,743	−1.40%
2010	11,747	+0.03%
2011	11,075	−5.72%
2012	10,855	−1.99%
2013	10,785	−0.64%
2014	10,669	−1.08%
2015	10,631	−0.36%
2016	10,595	−0.34%
2017	10,813	+2.06%
2018	10,537	−2.55%
2019	12,727	+20.78%
2020	12,630	−0.76%

Population as of 31 December (1946: 29 October 1950: 31 August)
Source: Source since 1994: Thuringian State office of Statistics

== Twin towns ==
Zella-Mehlis is twinned with:

- Andernach, Germany
- Gemünden am Main, Germany
- Saint-Martin-d'Hères, France

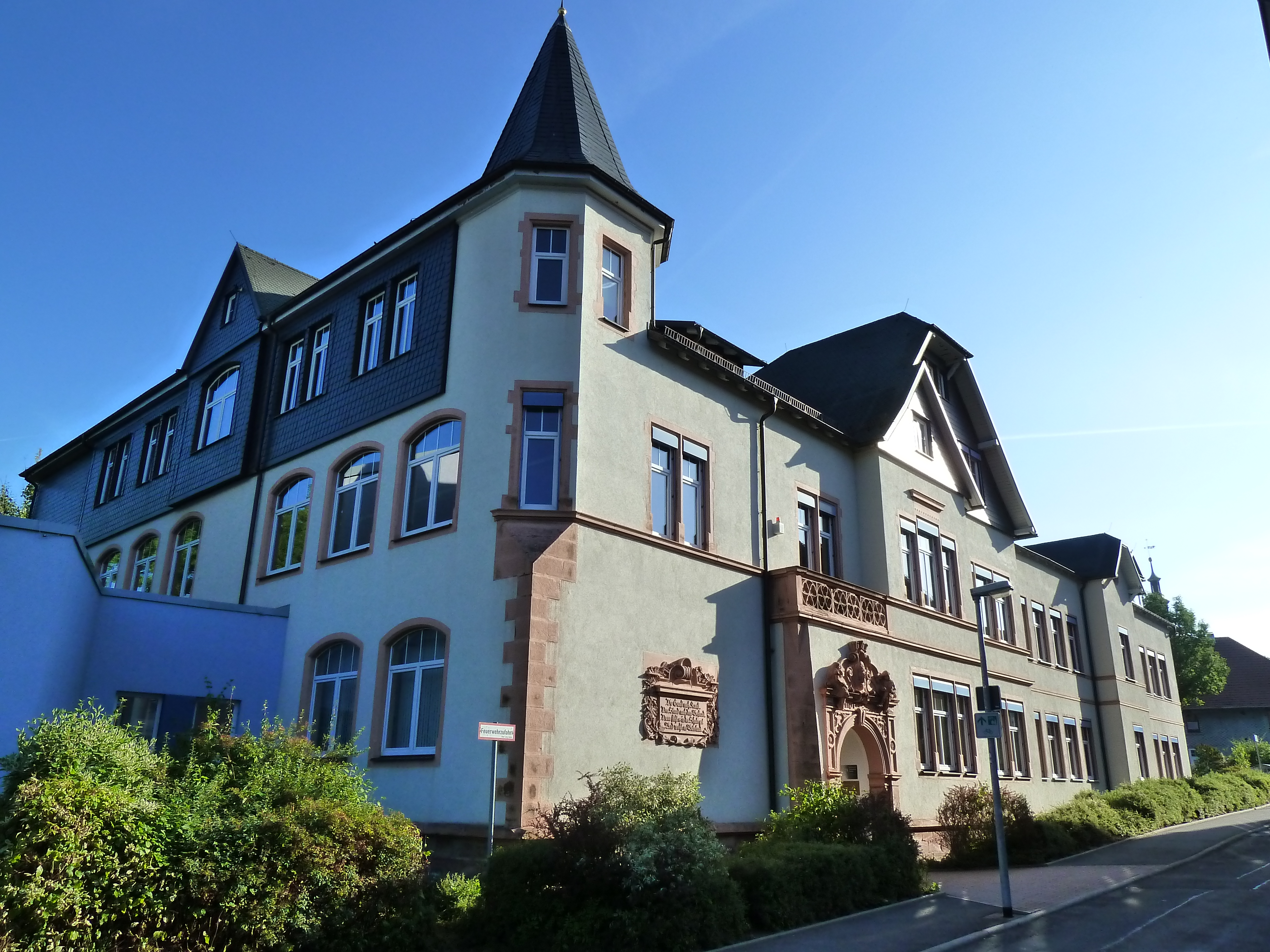
Martin Luther elementary school

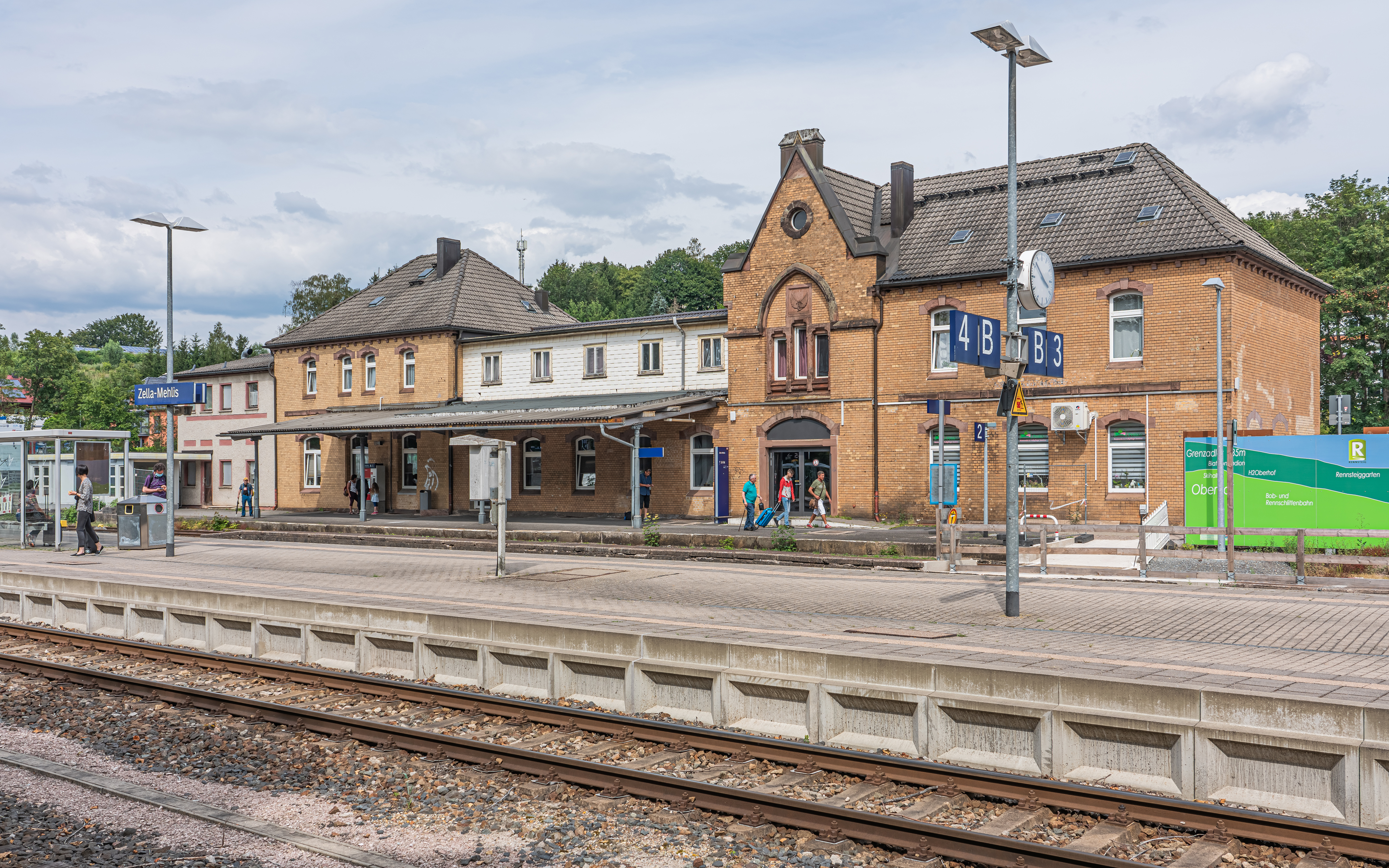
Train station Zella-Mehlis

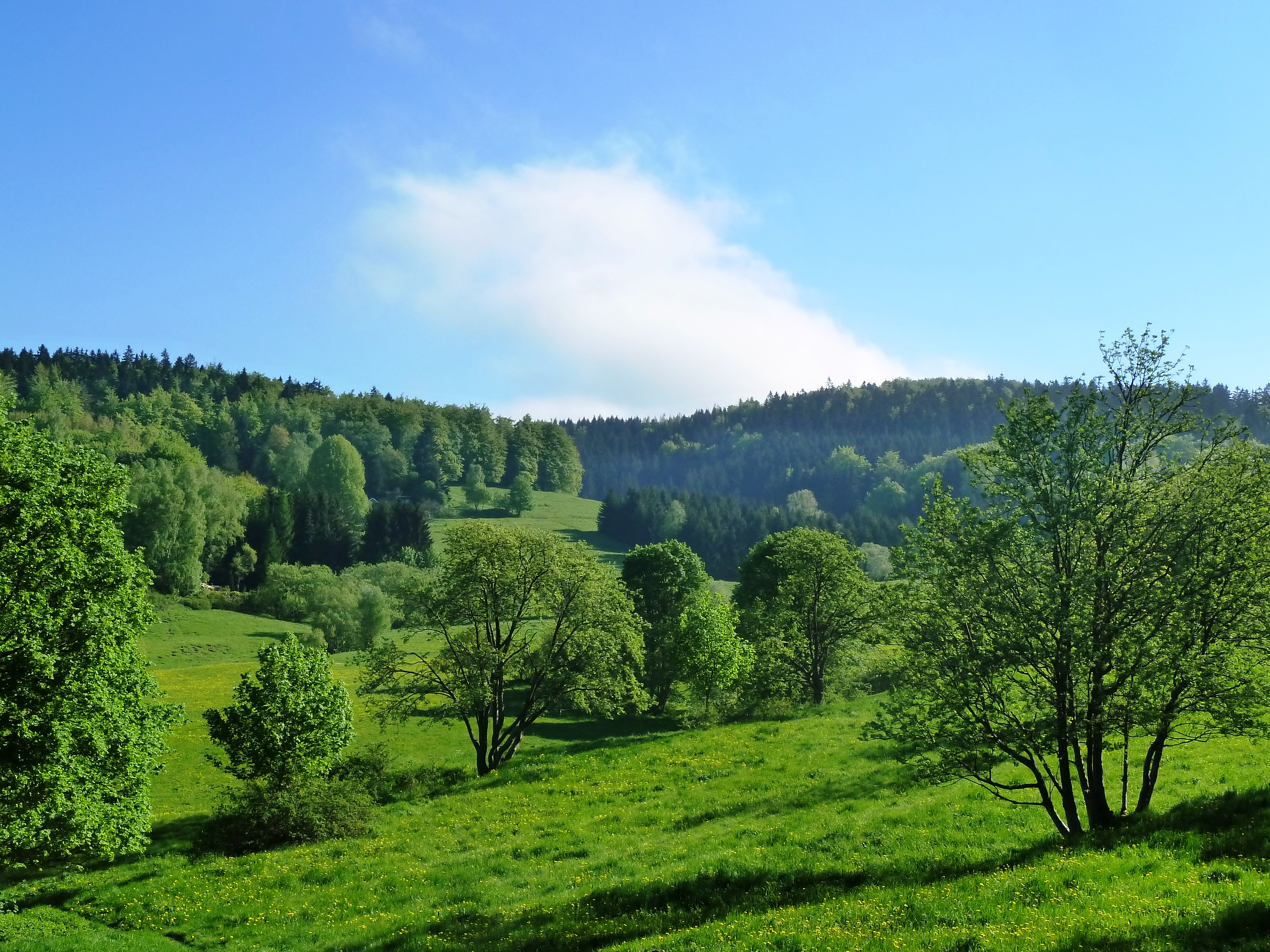
Surroundings of Zella-Mehlis

== People ==
- Helmut Recknagel (* 1937), the first German Olympic ski jumping champion and world champion, started for SC Motor Zella-Mehlis
- Johann Kaspar Friedrich Manso (1759-1826), teacher, historian and philologist
- Johann Heinrich Ehrhardt (1805-1883), locomotive builder, engineer of the Saxon Railroad
- Johann Peter Haseney (1812-1869), copper engraver, creator of the first German stamp "Schwarzer Einser" (Black one)
- Karl Künstler (1901–1945), Nazi SS concentration camp commandant
- Michael Schumann (1946-2000), professor of philosophy, politician (SED, PDS), Member of the Brandenburg Landtag, Member of the Bundestag
- Anja Kampe (born 1968), opera singer
- Carl Walther (1858-1915), gunsmith
- Marcel Callo (1921-1945), beatified member of the Roman Catholic Church, a location in Zella-Mehlis was named after him
- Horst Queck (born 1943), ski jumper
- Reinhard Heß (1945-2007), ski jumping coach of the German national team
- Fredi Albrecht (born 1947), wrestler and competitor, visited the children's and youth sports school here
- Klaus-Peter Göpfert (born 1948), wrestler, attended the children's and sports school in Zella-Mehlis
- Rainer Schmidt (born 1948), ski jumper, overall winner of the Four Hills Tournament, lives in Zella-Mehlis
- Christoph Matschie (born 1961), politician, SPD Chairman of the State of Thuringia 1999–2014, minister and parliamentary secretary of state, received training as a mechanic in Zella-Mehlis
- Kati Wilhelm (born 1976), biathlete
- Sebastian Haseney (born 1978), Nordic Combined skier
- Franz Göring (born 1984), cross-country skier, lives in Zella-Mehlis
- Victoria Carl (born 1995), cross-country skier
- Andi Langenhan (born 1984), luger
- Frank Rommel (born 1984), skeleton racer
- Tino Edelmann (born 1985), Nordic Combined skier
