= Opel Eisenach =

German manufacturing company

Opel Eisenach GmbH
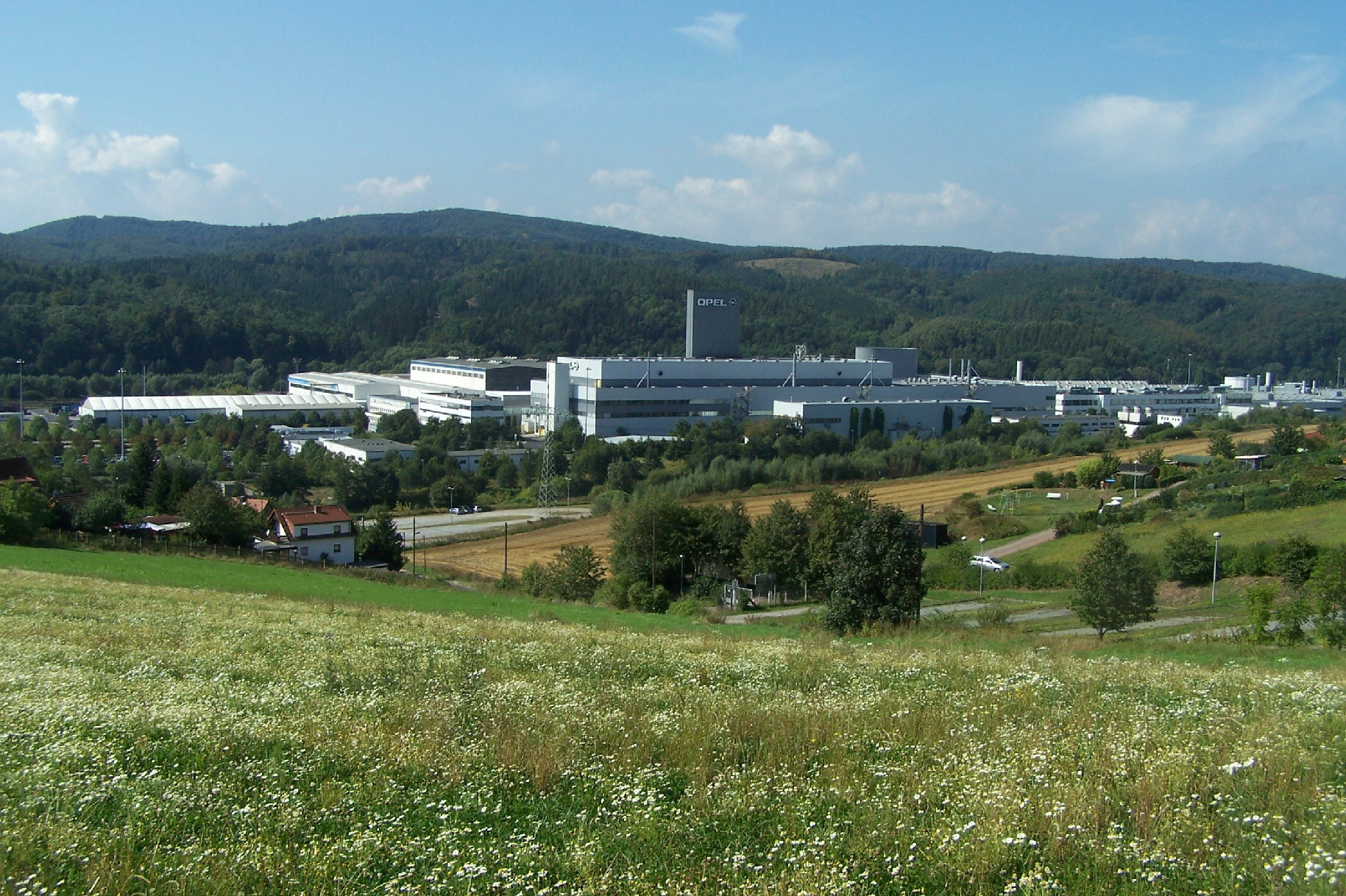
- Company type: GmbH
- Industry: Vehicle manufacturing
- Founded: 1990
- Headquarters: Eisenach, Thuringia, Germany
- Key people: Harald Lieske, Works council
- Products: Grandland
- Owner: Stellantis
- Number of employees: 1,360
- Parent: Opel Automobile GmbH

Opel Eisenach GmbH (formerly Opel AWE Planungs GmbH) is a German manufacturing company based at Eisenach in Thuringia, Germany and a subsidiary of Opel. It currently produces the Opel Grandland.

== History ==
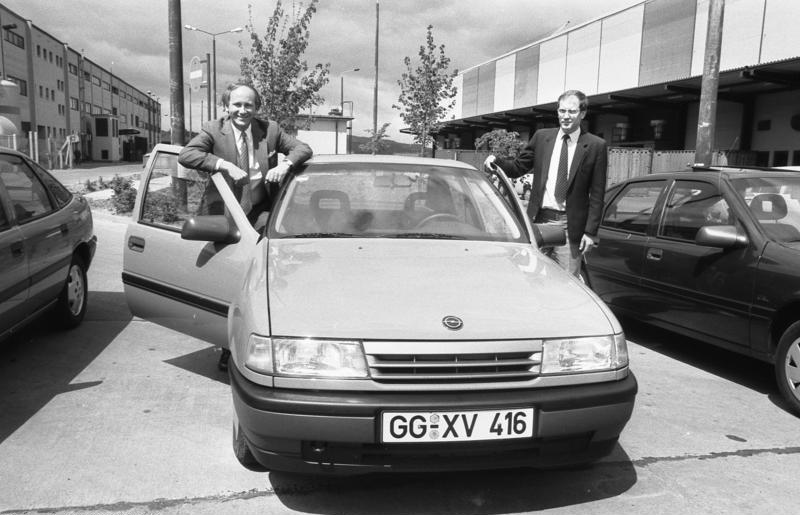
Presentation of the Opel Vectra at the (AWE) plant at Eisenach in May 1990. Assembly of the Vectra at the old Wartburg plant started five months later. One year after that the AWE plant closed, and another year later vehicle production started at Opel's new plant across the town.

In March 1990 Adam Opel AG and Automobilwerk Eisenach (AWE) (at that time best known in the west as the producer of the Wartburg) concluded a collaboration agreement. By 5 October 1990, AWE and Opel opened an assembly line for the Opel Vectra. Guests at the celebrations included Helmut Kohl, who two days earlier had become the first Chancellor of the newly reunified Germany.

Another agreement was signed on 13 December 1990, this time between Treuhand president Detlev Rohwedder, Opel Chairman Louis R. Hughes and AWE directors, for the purchase of land in the Gries business park, to the west of the Wartburgstadt, where a new car assembly plant was to be built. A foundation stone for the new plant was laid on 7 February 1991 and, once the roof was on the building, a "topping out" ceremony was held on 9 September 1991. The existing (AWE) plant was closed and production of the Wartburg 1.3 (a short-lived re-engined version of the Wartburg 353) ended.

Production of Opel Corsa and Opel Astra models started on September, 23rd 1992 at the Eisenach Opel plant. Employing just 1,900 people at the time, the facility was described as the most successful and productive car factory in Europe.

The introduction of a third shift on 4 October 1993 marked the end of the plant's start-up phase. By 16 October 1996 Eisenach had notched up production of half a million Opels, and the millionth car came off the line on 16 November 1999.

The bankruptcy of General Motors, the factory's ultimate parent company, raised doubts about Opel's ownership and indeed its survival for several months in 2009. The uncertainty also affected the Eisenach facility where production was halted at times.

== Products ==
Since August 2019, the Eisenach factory has been manufacturing regular and PHEV versions of the Opel Grandland. Between 1990 and 2009 the plant produced 2.5 million vehicles. In 2010, Opel decided to build its new city car at the production plant. The first such city car, called the Opel Adam was produced in January 2013. Opel Eisenach manufactured the Opel Corsa between 1993 and 2019. Production of both Corsa E and Adam ended in May 2019.

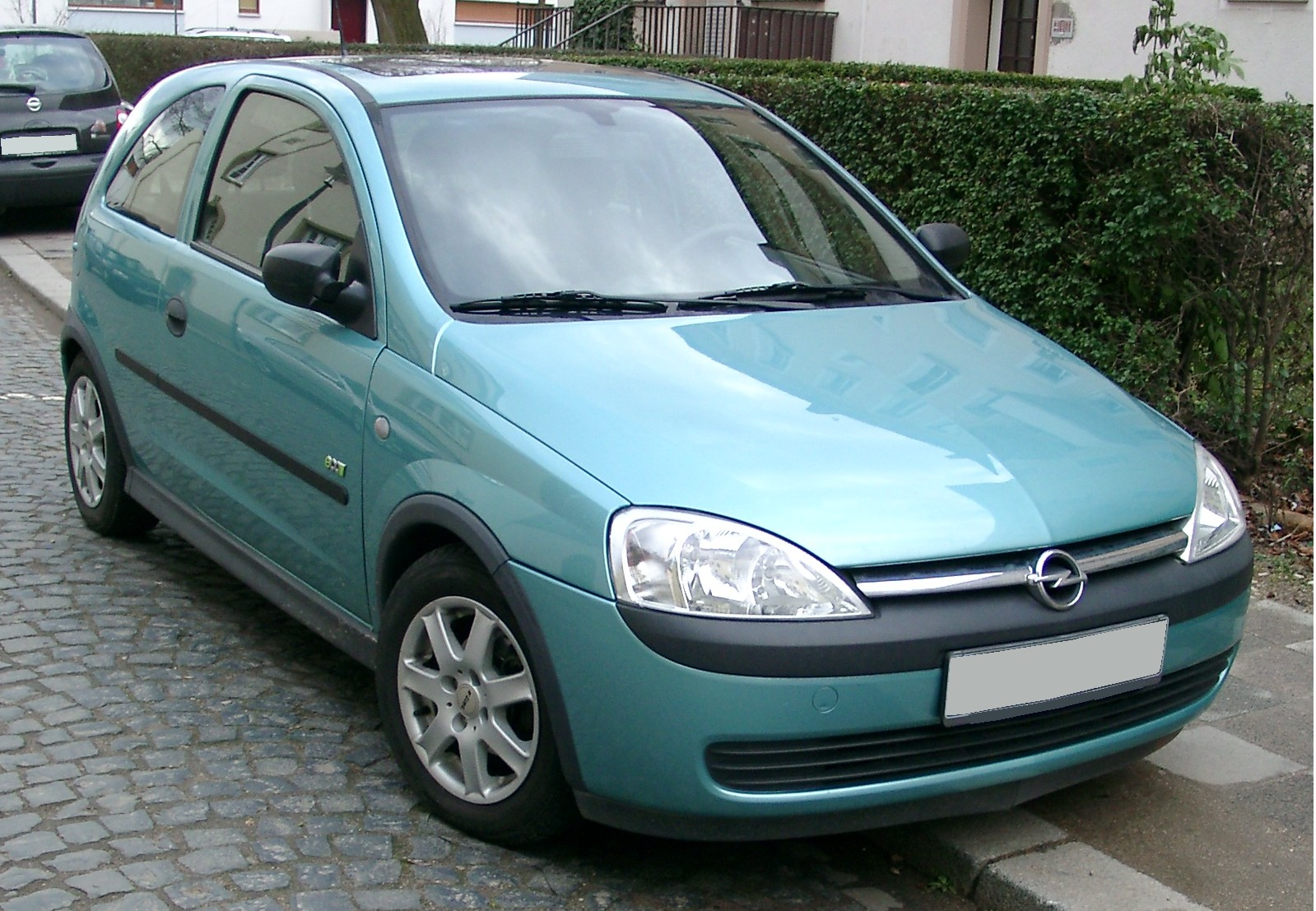
Opel Corsa C 3-door

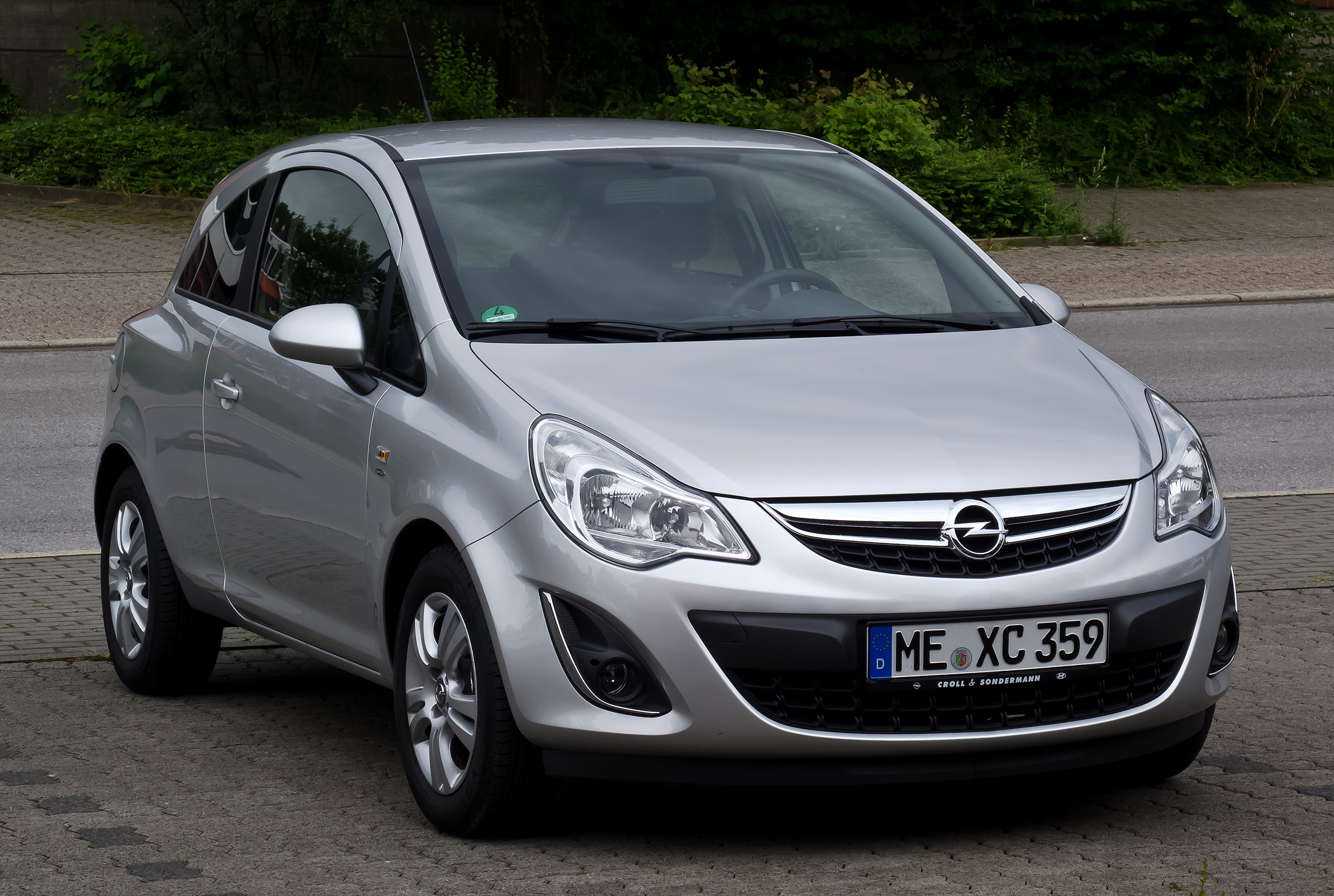
Opel Corsa D 3-door

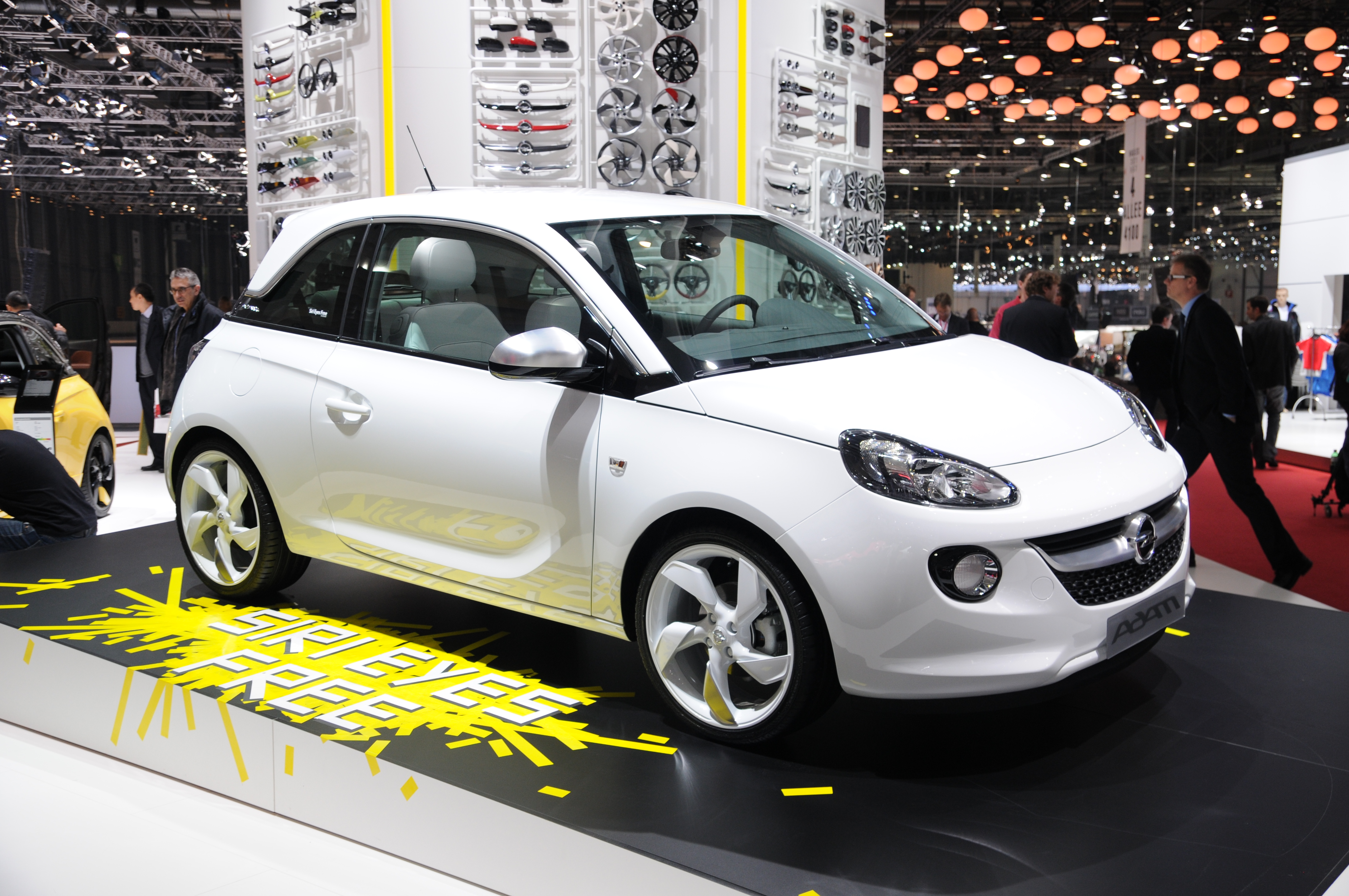
Opel Adam

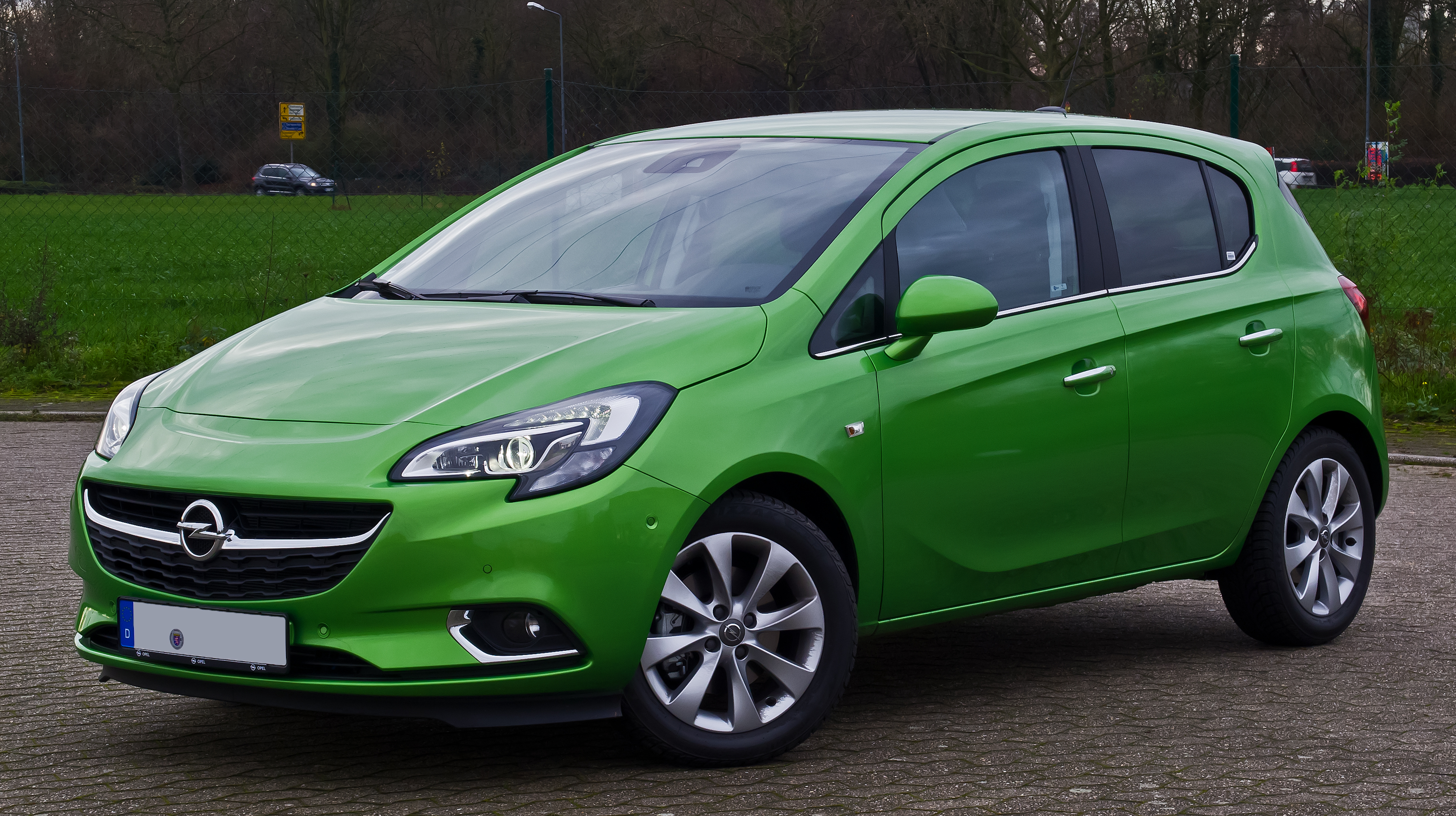
Opel Corsa E 5-door

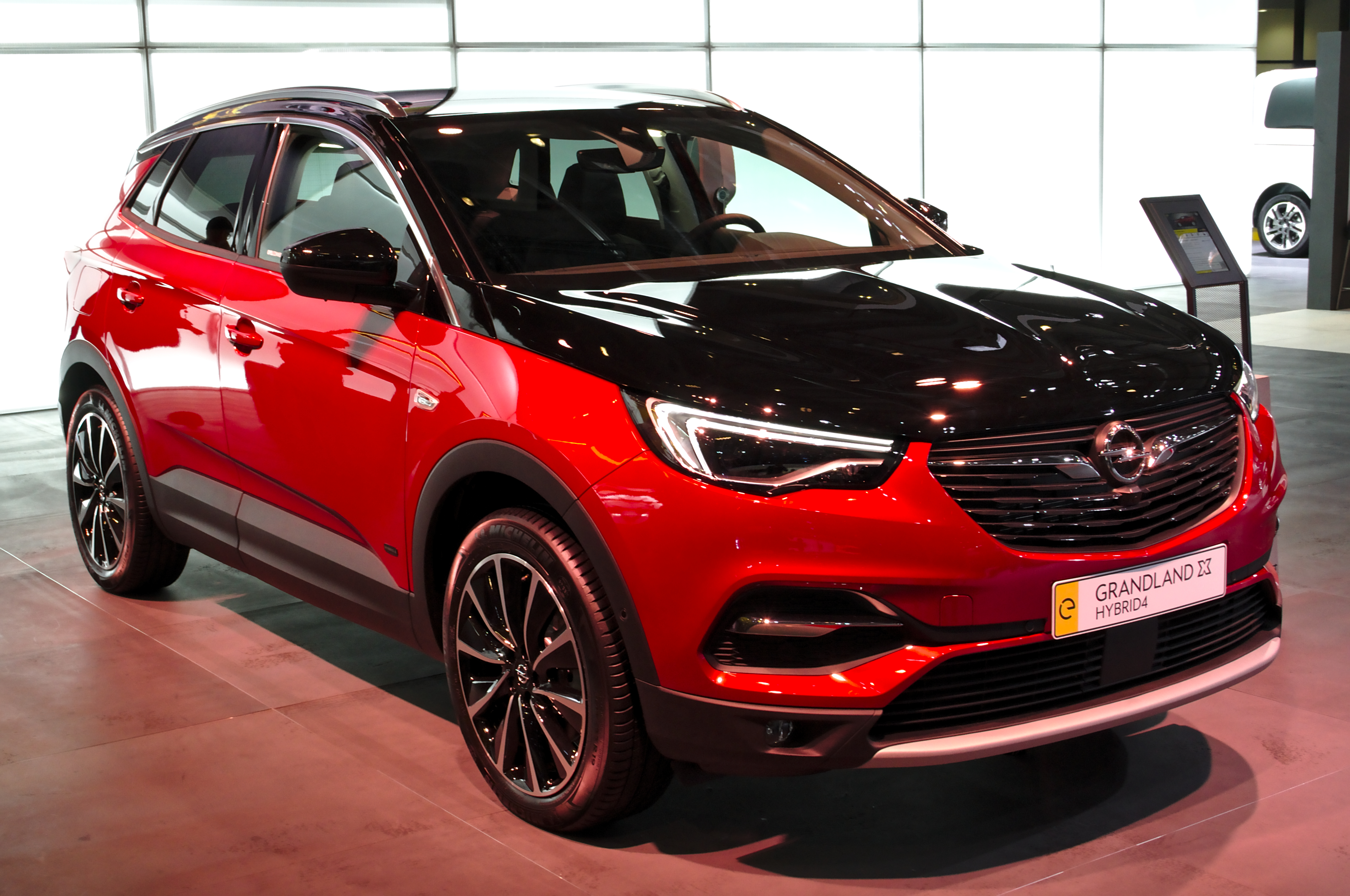
Opel Grandland X PHEV

== See also ==
- Opel
- Opel Special Vehicles
- Opel Performance Center
