= Kübelwagen =

Kübelwagen is a German word, contracted from Kübelsitzwagen (literally: 'bucket-seat car') – originally military slang for doorless cross-country and field-cars, fitted with bucket seats, to prevent riders from falling out of the vehicle – became a household word similar in meaning to the English "jeep".

Kübelwagen is mostly associated with the Volkswagen type 82 Kübelwagen, but it may also refer to:

== Kübelwagen vehicles ==
- Einheits-PKW der Wehrmacht – German WW II military cross-country cars
- Intermeccanica VW Kübelwagen replica
- Mercedes-Benz 170 VK Kübelwagen
- Mercedes-Benz W142/III and W142/IV Kübelwagen
- Steyr 1500A and Steyr 2000A V8, 4x4 field-cars (18,850 made from 1941 to 1945)
- Tatra 57K Kübelwagen
- Trabant 601 Kübel and Tramp models
- Volkswagen Kübelwagen
- Volkswagen Type 181 'Thing'

== See also ==
- Military light utility vehicle
