= Barkas (surname) =

Barkas is a surname. Notable people with the surname include:

- Harry Barkas (1906–1974), English footballer
- Mary Barkas (1889–1959), New Zealand psychiatrist, physician and author
- Ned Barkas (1901–1962), English footballer
- Sam Barkas (1909–1989), English footballer and manager
- Tommy Barkas (1912–1991), English footballer
- Walter H. Barkas (1912–1969), American physicist
- Vasilis Barkas (born 1994), Greek footballer
