= Channell =

Channell is a surname. Notable people with the surname include:

- Arthur Moseley Channell (1838–1928), English rower and judge
- Carl Channell, American political fundraiser
- Craig Channell (born 1962) Canadian ice hockey player
- Fred Channell (1910–1975), English footballer
- Ian Brackenbury Channell, stage name The Wizard of New Zealand (born 1932), New Zealand educator
- Les Channell (1886–1954), American baseball player was a Major League Baseball
- Mellissa Channell (born 1994) Canadian ice hockey player
