= Billy Felton =

English footballer (1900-1977)

Personal information
- Full name: William Felton
- Date of birth: 1 August 1900
- Place of birth: Heworth, Tyne and Wear, England
- Date of death: 22 April 1977 (aged 76)
- Place of death: Manchester, England
- Height: 5 ft 9 in (1.75 m)
- Position: Full back

Youth career
- Pelaw Albion
- Pandon Temperance
- Wardley Colliery

Senior career*
| Years | Team | Apps | (Gls) |
| 1919–1921 | Jarrow | ? | (?) |
| 1921–1922 | Grimsby Town | 43 | (0) |
| 1922–1929 | Sheffield Wednesday | 158 | (0) |
| 1929–1932 | Manchester City | 73 | (0) |
| 1932–1934 | Tottenham Hotspur | 73 | (1) |
| 1934–1939 | Altrincham | 181 | (12) |

International career
| 1925 | England | 1 | (0) |
- * Club domestic league appearances and goals

William Felton (1 August 1900 – 22 April 1977) was an English professional footballer who played as a full back for a number of football league clubs, including Sheffield Wednesday, Manchester City and Tottenham Hotspur in the 1920s and 1930s, before a long spell with Altrincham. He earned a solitary cap for England in 1925.

== Career ==
=== Early career ===
Felton was born in Heworth, Tyne and Wear into a mining family. His cousins included Sam Barkas (Bradford City, Manchester City and England), Tommy Barkas (Halifax Town), Ned Barkas (Huddersfield Town, Birmingham and Chelsea) and Harry Barkas (South Shields, Gateshead and Liverpool). While working as a coal-miner, he played amateur football for various colliery teams before joining Jarrow in the North Eastern League.

In January 1921, he joined his first Football League club, Grimsby Town playing in the Third Division. For the 1921–22 season, Grimsby joined the newly formed Third Division North and Felton soon became a regular in the first team. Grimsby finished the season in third place, but only the champions were promoted.

=== Sheffield Wednesday ===
In December 1922, he moved to Second Division Sheffield Wednesday for a fee of £1500, making his debut on 1 January 1923 in a goalless draw against Southampton. He soon became a fixture in the team and gained a reputation as a tough, excellent, uncompromising tackler, comfortable at either right or left back, with excellent powers of recovery.

In 1923–24 he missed a handful of games, as Wednesday finished in eight place. The following season he was a virtual ever-present, missing only two games as Wednesday again finished in a mid-table position. Success eventually came in 1925–26 when Felton formed a full-back pairing with Ernie Blenkinsop, which helped Wednesday claim the Second Division title by three points over Derby County.

His only international appearance came against France on 21 May 1925. In this match, England's goalkeeper Freddie Fox had to leave the field in the 75th minute following a head injury sustained in a charge by Jules Dewaquez when scoring a goal, and was prevented from completing his sole appearance for England. Following an earlier withdrawal by Vivian Gibbins, the scorer of England's opening goal, England finished with nine men, but managed to hang on to win the game 3–2.

Once in the First Division, Felton lost his regular place to Tommy Walker who had been signed from Bradford City in March 1926. Although Felton remained at Hillsborough for three First Division seasons, his appearances were now infrequent and, in March 1929 he was transferred to Manchester City. In his six years with Wednesday, he made a total of 164 appearances in all competitions.

=== Manchester City ===
Felton spent three years at Maine Road in the First Division. In 1929–30 he was paired up with John Ridley as City finished the season in third place, although they were thirteen points behind the champions, Felton's former club, Sheffield Wednesday.

In March 1932, Felton played for Manchester City in an FA Cup semi-final against Arsenal. In the final minute of the match Felton lost possession of the ball to Arsenal forward Jack Lambert who set up Cliff Bastin for the winning goal. Though earlier in the match Felton had prevented a goal by clearing an Alex James shot off the line, he was deemed responsible for the defeat, and never played for the club again, being transferred almost immediately to London club Tottenham Hotspur of the Second Division. In total Felton made 83 appearances for Manchester City.

=== Tottenham Hotspur ===
At Tottenham, he became team captain and in 1932–33 he missed only one match as he led the club to promotion as runners-up by one point to Stoke City.

Once back in the First Division, Felton again lost his place, this time to Fred Channell and at the end of the 1933–34 season he was placed on the transfer list. In his two years at White Hart Lane he played a total of 75 games, scoring once from a penalty, in a 1–1 draw with Arsenal on 11 September 1933.

=== Altrincham ===
Spurs had been looking for a transfer fee of £1000, but eventually accepted an offer of £500 from Altrincham of the Cheshire County League. Felton made his debut for Altrincham in an FA Cup tie against Timperley Athletic. He was immediately appointed team captain and went on to help Altrincham clinch the runners-up spot in the Cheshire League for the next two seasons.

At Moss Lane he was a near ever-present during his five seasons. Rarely injured, he led the side with dedication and total professionalism. Playing primarily as a left back he was just as comfortable on the right. He took on the responsibility as Altrincham's "dead ball" specialist, even though he had only scored one goal in his professional career. Unusually, he even managed to score a hat trick against Hurst in an 8–1 win, two of the goals being penalties and the third a free kick.

After finishing second in the league in successive seasons (1934–35 & 1935–36), Altrincham started to struggled to survive financially. Felton was appointed player-coach for his final season (1938–39) before retiring just prior to his 39th birthday and the onset of the Second World War. In his five seasons at Moss Lane, he made a total of 210 appearances, scoring 17 goals.
