= Barkas =

Barkas may refer to:

- Barkas (van manufacturer), a van manufacturer in the German Democratic Republic
- Barkas, Hyderabad, a neighbourhood of Hyderabad, India
- Barkas (surname)

== See also ==
- Barcas, a notable family in the ancient city of Carthage
