= Barkas V 901/2 =

Lorry from the 1950s in East Germany

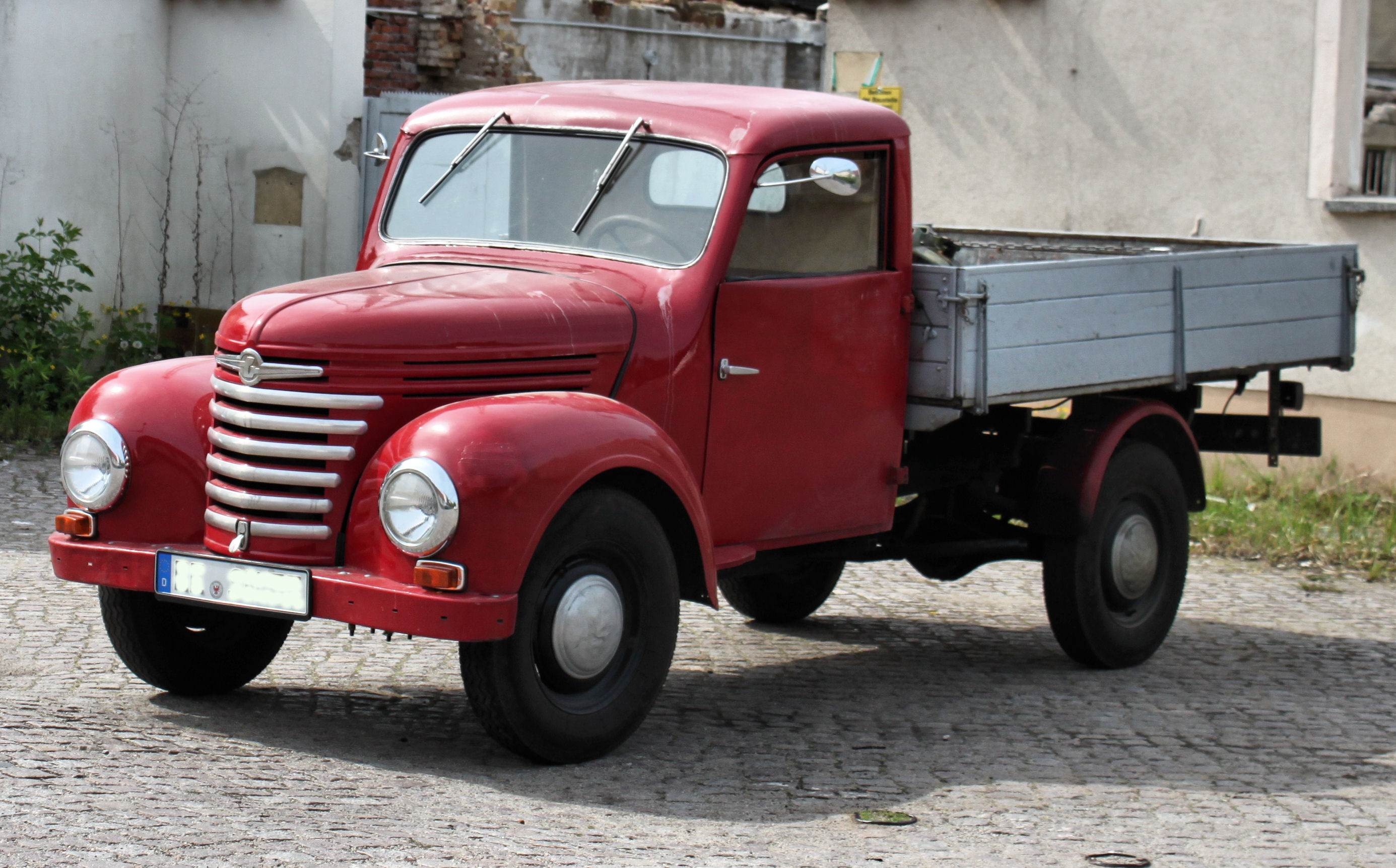

Overview
- Manufacturer: VEB Barkas-Werke, Hainichen
- Also called: Barkas, Framo
- Production: 1954–1961
- Assembly: East Germany: Karl-Marx-Stadt

Body and chassis
- Class: Light commercial vehicle (M)
- Body style: panel van 4-door minibus 2-door pickup
- Layout: FR layout
- Platform: Barkas V 901

Powertrain
- Engine: 900 cm^{3} two-stroke Otto; AWE 310/4 (21 kW)

Dimensions
- Wheelbase: 2800 or 3100 mm
- Length: 4360 or 4375 mm
- Width: 1600 or 1650 mm
- Height: 1650 or 1910 mm
- Kerb weight: 1000, 1210, or 1320 kg

Chronology
- Predecessor: Barkas V 901
- Successor: Barkas B 1000

The Barkas V 901/2 is a light commercial lorry made by the East-German manufacturer VEB Barkas-Werke, Hainichen in Karl-Marx-Stadt (Chemnitz) from 1954 until 1961. Originally, the vehicle was called the IFA V 901/2; this name was changed to Barkas V 901/2 in 1957. The V 901/2 is a body-on-frame vehicle with a front engine, and rear-wheel drive, that was available in several different body styles, including pickup trucks, minibusses, and panel vans. It succeeded the IFA Framo V 901, and was itself succeeded by the Barkas B 1000.

== Technical description ==
The V 901/2 is a body-on-frame lorry with two axles; the frame is made from welded U-sections. It was available with two wheelbase options, 2800 mm and 3100 mm, and three different payload options (520, 690, and 900 kg). The rear axle is a leaf-sprung live beam axle; in front, the V 901/2 has independent suspension with suspension arms and leaf springs. On all four wheels, the V 901/2 has hydraulically operated drum brakes. For steering, the V 901/2 uses a rack-and-pinion system. The engine is a water-cooled, straight-three cylinder, two-stroke Otto engine with a cylinder bore of 70 mm and a piston stroke of 78 mm, displacing 900.5 cm^{3}. It is rated 28 PS (20.6 kW) at 3,600/min and can put out a maximum torque of 7.25 kp·m (71 N·m) at 2,250/min. The engine torque is sent through a dry single-disc clutch and a non-synchronised constant-mesh four-speed gearbox to the rear wheels. Depending on the axle-drive ratio, the V 901/2 can reach a top speed of either 75 or 82 km/h.

== Gallery ==
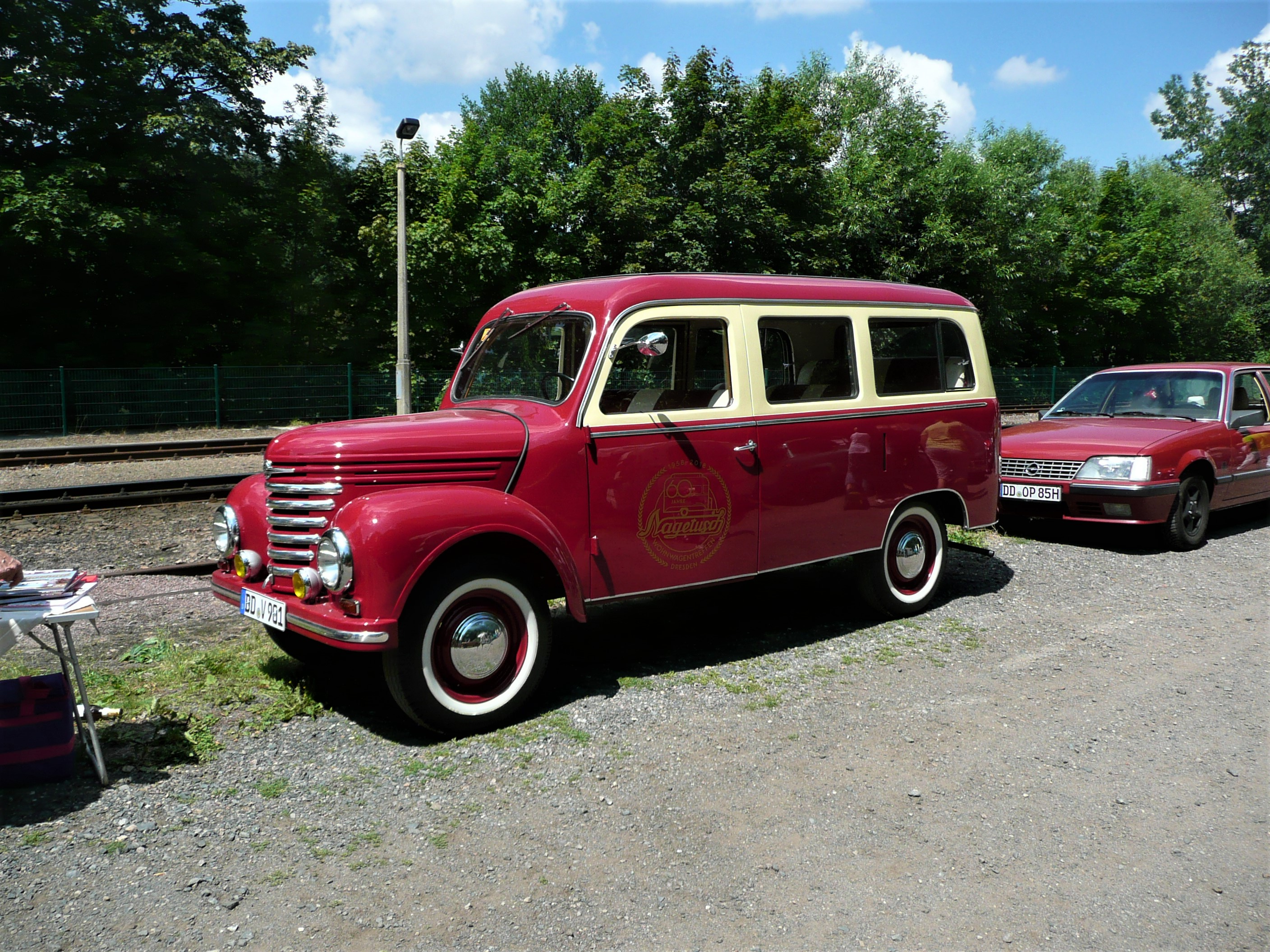
Barkas V 901/2 minibus

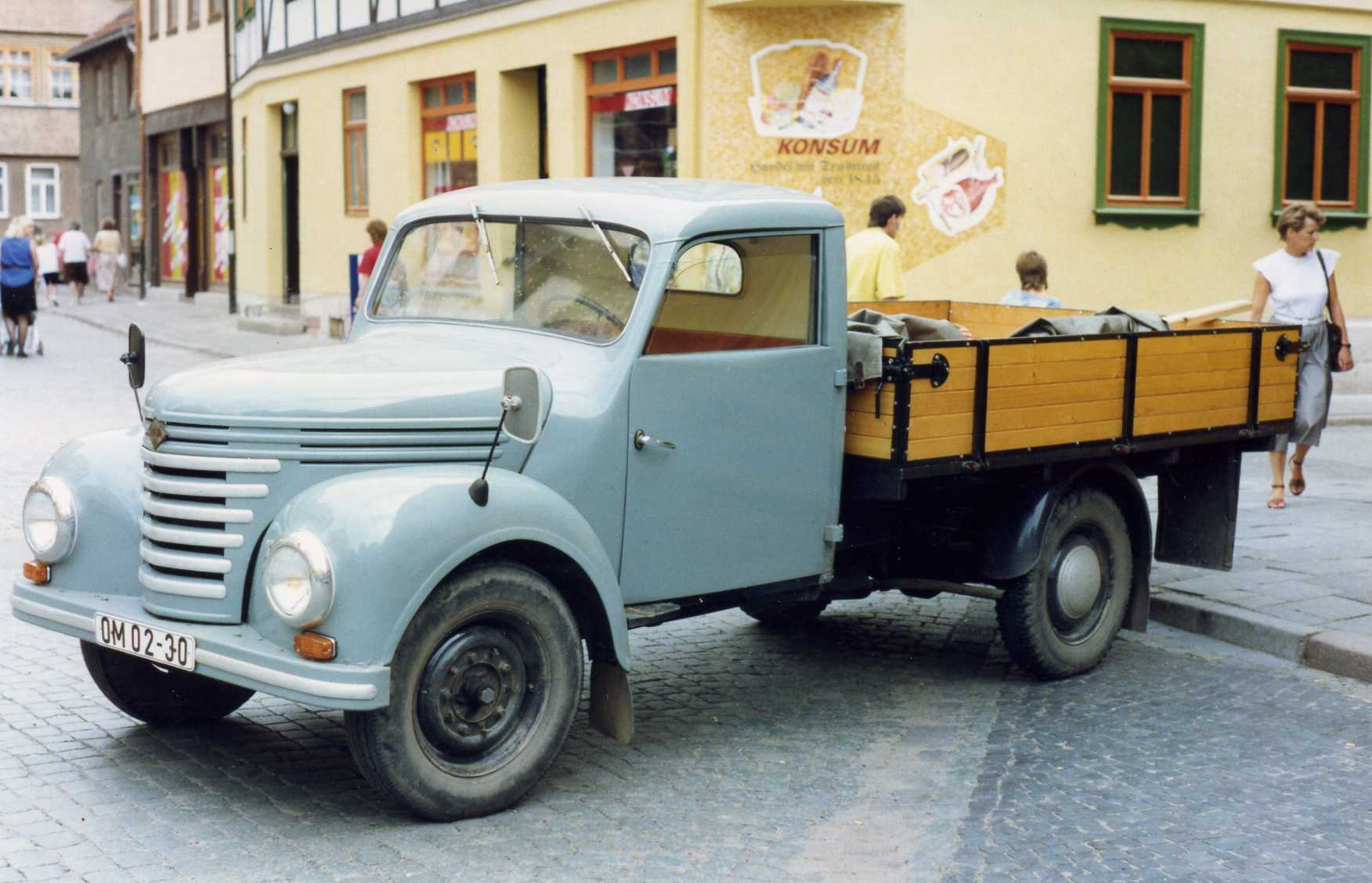
Barkas V 901/2 pickup

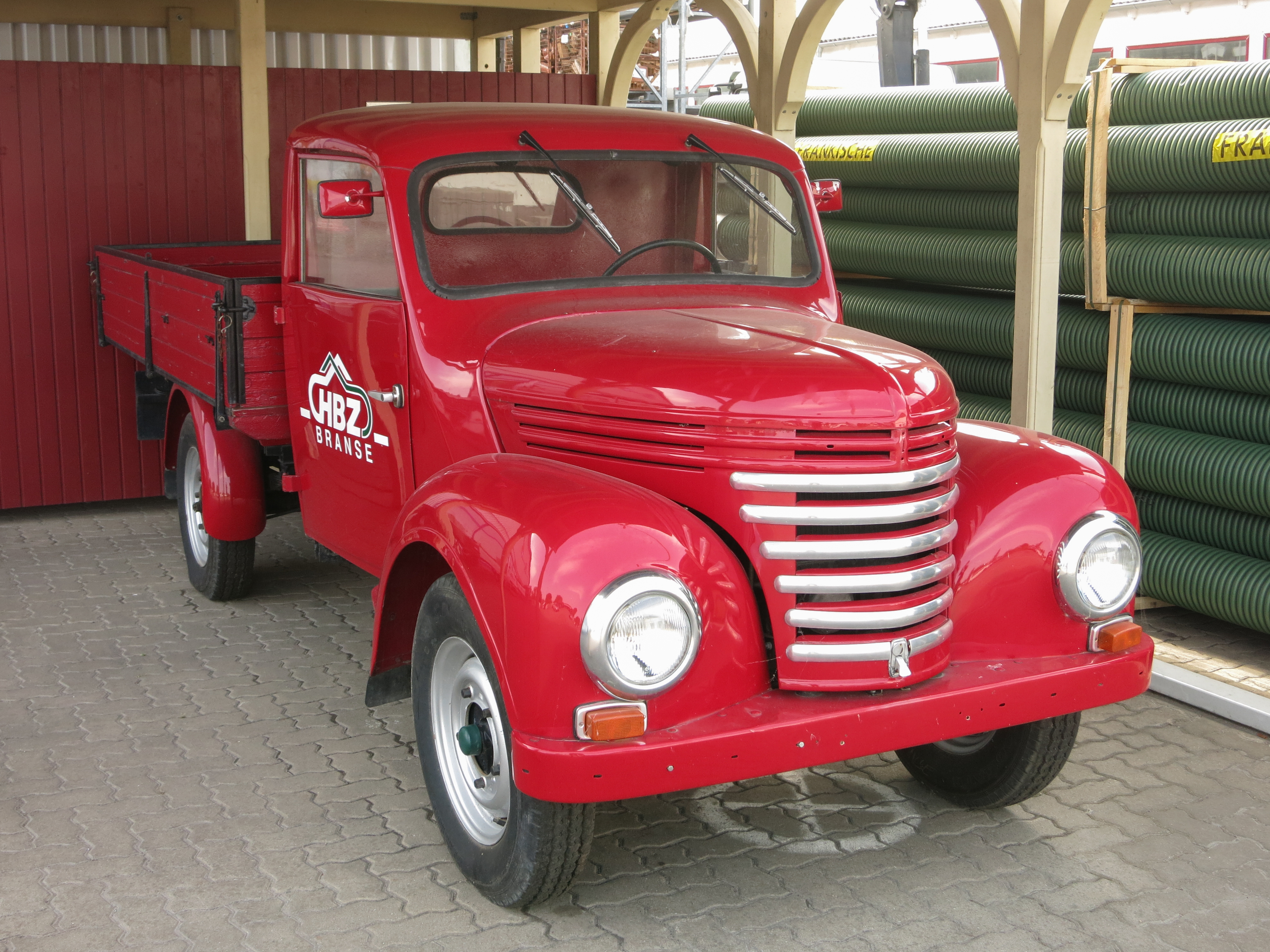
Barkas V 901/2 pickup

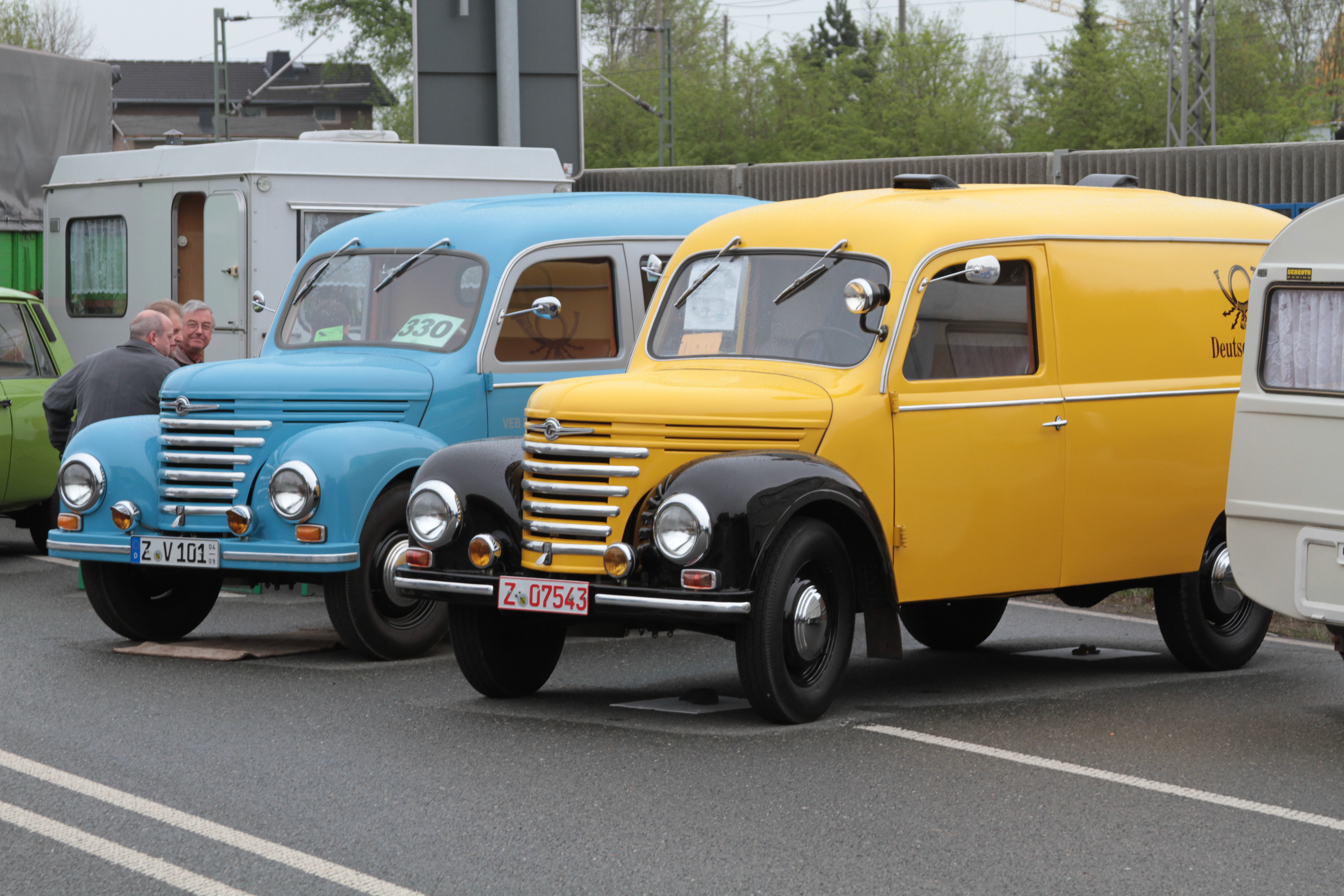
A V 901/2 minibus next to a Deutsche Post der DDR panel van

== Bibliography ==
- Werner Oswald (ed.): Kraftfahrzeuge der DDR. 2nd edition. Motorbuch-Verlag, Stuttgart 2000, ISBN 3-613-01913-2, p. 195–199
