= Barkas B 1000-1 =

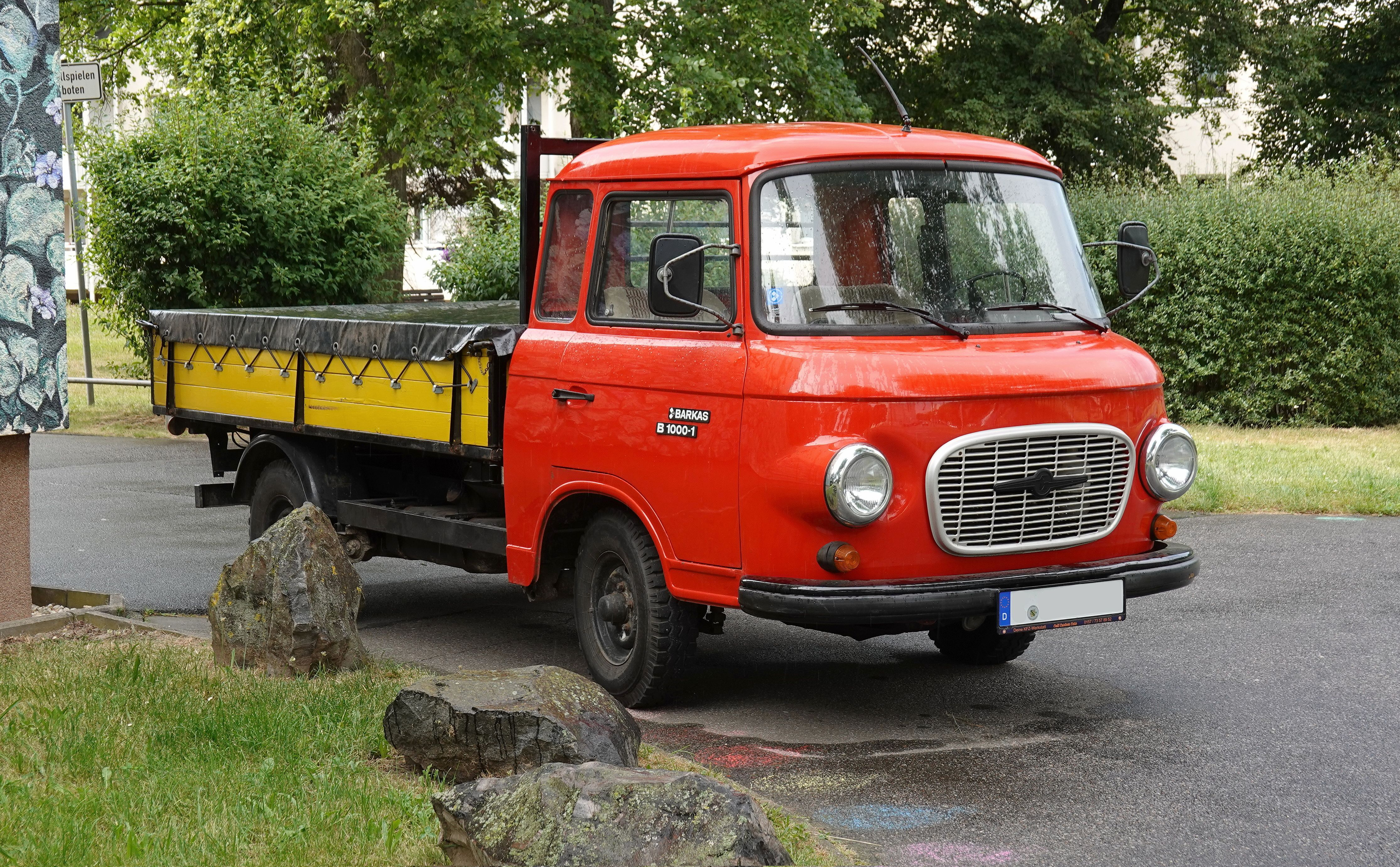

Overview
- Manufacturer: VEB Barkas-Werke
- Production: 1990–April 1991
- Assembly: Germany: Chemnitz

Body and chassis
- Related: Wartburg 1.3

Powertrain
- Engine: 1272 cm³ VW EA111

Chronology
- Predecessor: Barkas B 1000

The Barkas B 1000-1 was a van introduced in the autumn of 1989, with series production starting during the course of 1990. Like the Wartburg 1.3, it had a four-stroke engine with 58 hp (43 kW) and a displacement of 1272 cm³, which was produced under Volkswagen license (VW EA111) by Barkas at the engine plant in Karl-Marx-Stadt.

Originally, it was planned to also revise the exterior of the Barkas transporters with the four-stroke engine. A large plastic component that combined the headlights and the radiator grille was intended to modernize the front section. Several prototypes were built. However, the new front design never went into series production. Until production ceased on 10 April 1991, a total of 1,900 units were built.

== Discontinuation ==
When the discontinuation of production was decided, a project was initiated to relocate production to Russia. Everything was packed, documented, and provided with Russian translations by the former production managers. After approximately four million DM were spent updating the production documentation and machinery, everything was packed into 40 large containers. However, several investors withdrew, and in the end, no one was able to cover the transportation costs to Russia. On January 10, 1994, the project was declared a failure. The Treuhandanstalt then had everything scrapped. Thus ended a long-standing vehicle production; at the various production sites, 2,300 people lost their jobs.

== Gallery ==
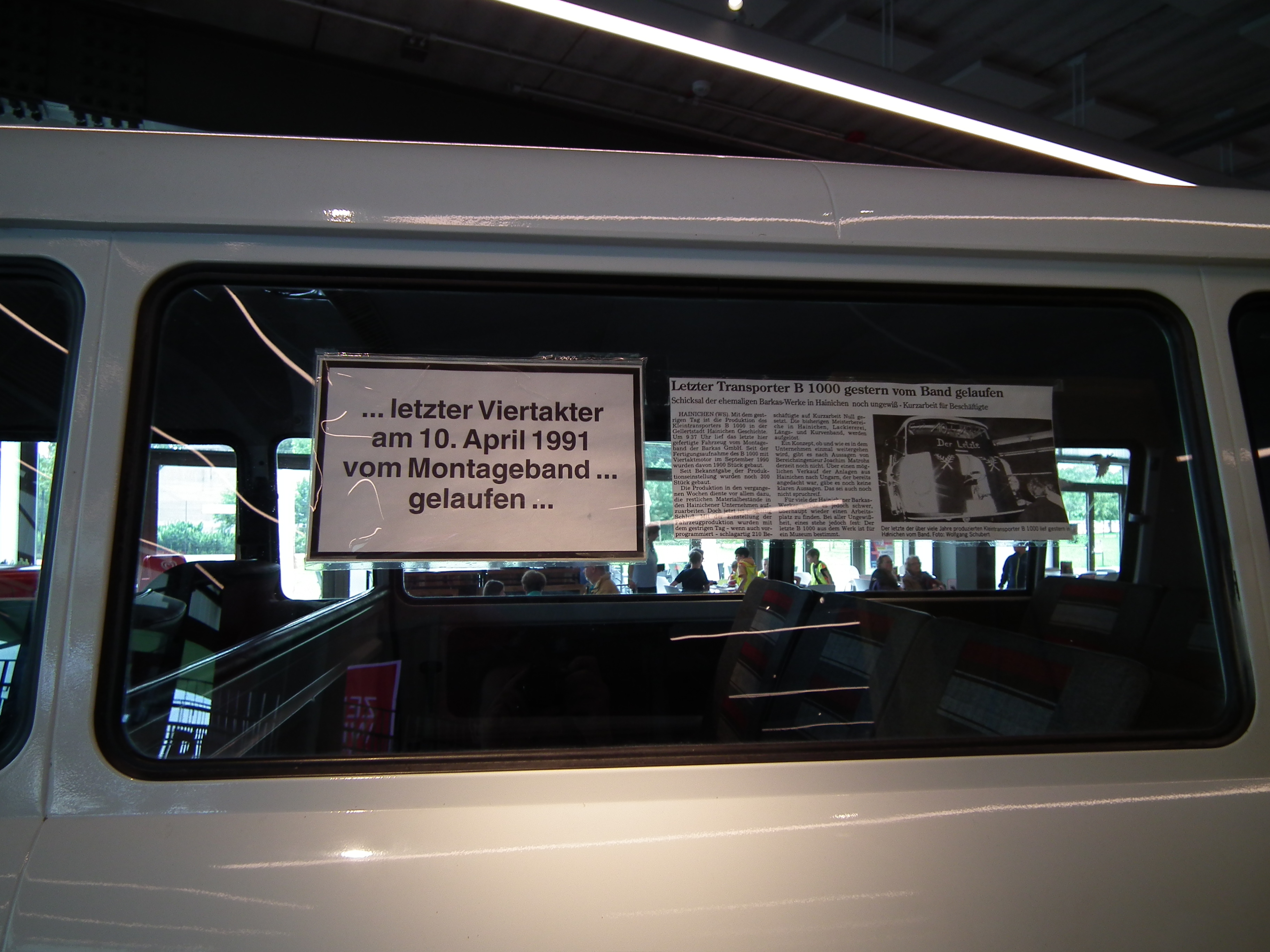
The last four-stroke Barkas, which came off the assembly line on 10 April 1991

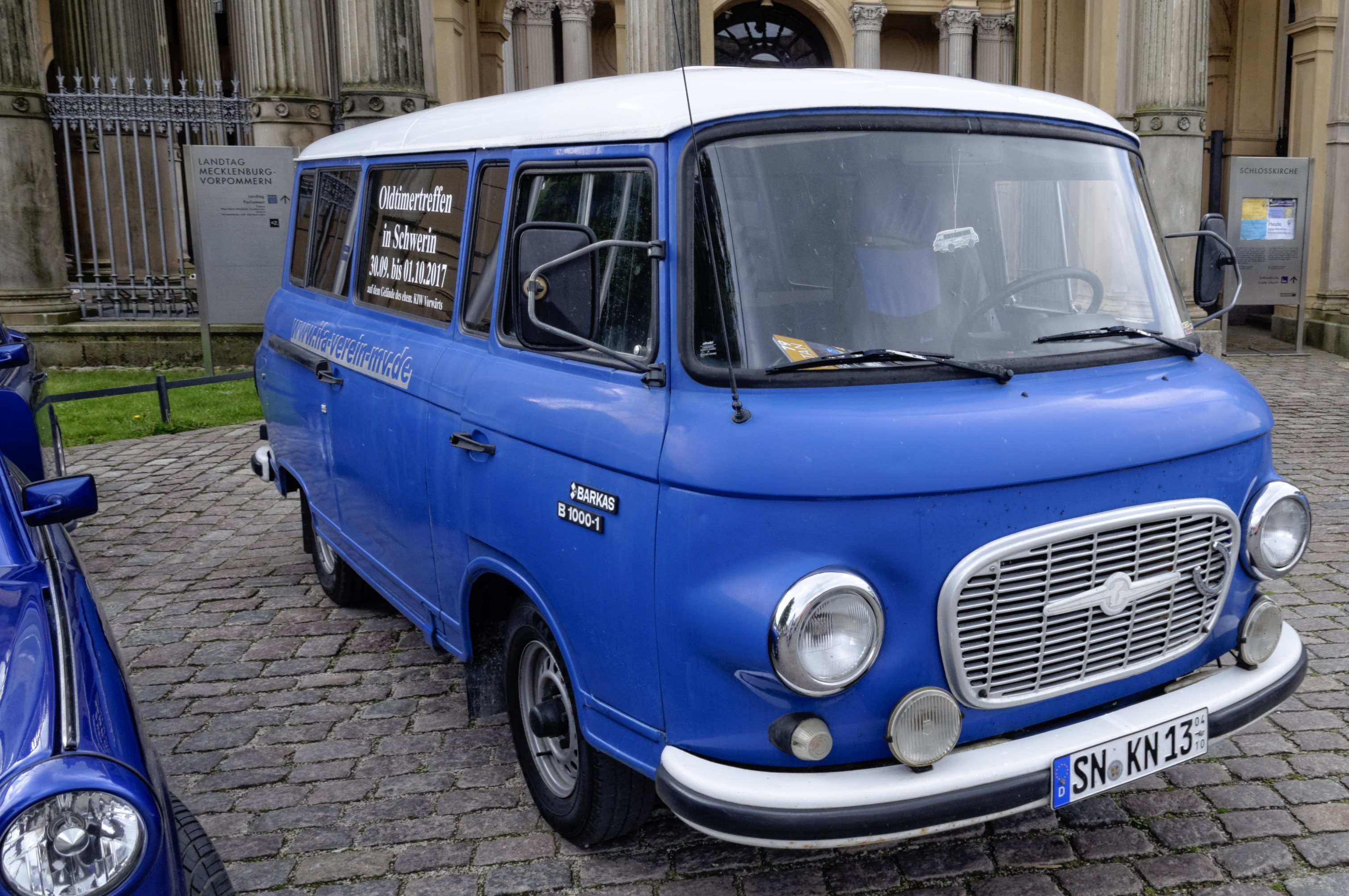
