= Barkas B 1000 =

East German van produced from 1961–1988

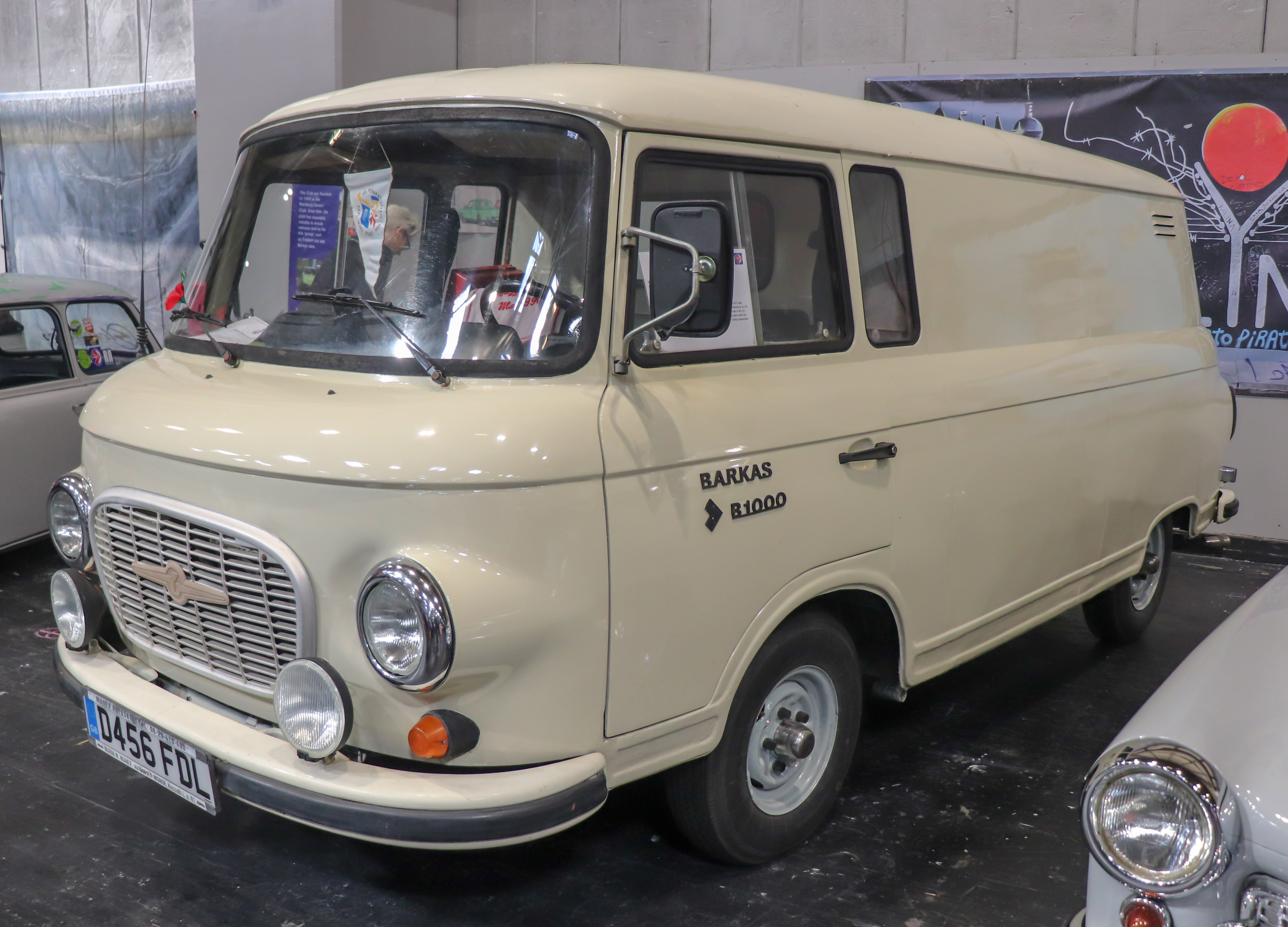
- 1987 Barkas B 1000 panel van

Overview
- Manufacturer: VEB Barkas-Werke
- Production: June 1961–1988
- Assembly: East Germany: Chemnitz

Body and chassis
- Class: Light commercial vehicle (M)
- Body style: 4-door panel van 4-door minibus 2-door pickup
- Layout: Longitudinal FF layout

Powertrain
- Engine: 1-litre two-stroke Otto; 1.0 L AWE 312-016 I3 (1961–1972); 1.0 L AWE 353/1 I3 (1972–1988)
- Power output: 31 kW (42 hp) (1961–1972); 33 kW (44 hp) (1972–1988)
- Transmission: 4-speed manual

Dimensions
- Wheelbase: 2,400 mm (94.5 in)

Chronology
- Predecessor: Barkas V 901/2
- Successor: Barkas B 1000-1

The Barkas B 1000 is a forward control van made by East German manufacturer Barkas from 1961 to 1988, in Chemnitz (then Karl-Marx-Stadt). It was made in multiple body styles: a van, a minibus seating eight, and a pickup truck. Special-purpose vehicles based on the B 1000 were made as well.

== Overview ==
The B 1000 uses body-on-frame construction, with box-section or U-section frame rails being used depending on the type of vehicle; panel vans and minibuses have box-section frames, whilst pickup trucks and special vehicles have U-section frames. It is powered by a 1-litre liquid-cooled two-stroke straight-three engine coupled to a four-speed synchromesh manual transmission and mounted ahead of the front axle, between the driver and passenger seats. Depending on configuration, the B 1000 can reach a top speed of 95–100 km/h (59–62 mph).

The B 1000's independent suspension is of a diagonal link design in both the front and rear, with torsion bars and hydraulic shock absorbers. Hydraulically operated drum brakes are also present on both axles.

Production of the four-door panel van commenced in June 1961, with the minibus following in spring 1964, and the pickup truck in spring 1965.

With its payload of 1,000 kg (2,200 lb) and its spacious interior, the B 1000 proved to be very durable and reliable.

The B 1000 received some minor updates in 1963 and 1972:

- 1963: The single-circuit brake system was upgraded to a dual-circuit brake system, and the column shifter was replaced with a regular central shifter.
- 1972: The 220 W alternator was replaced with a 500 W alternator, and power output was increased from 31 kW (42 hp) to 33 kW (44 hp).

There were no major design alterations across the B 1000's 27-year production period. The succeeding Barkas B 1000-1, introduced in autumn 1989, carried over the B 1000's underlying design, but was fitted with a different engine.

In 1990, manufacturing operations were sold to a Russian company, but production was never restarted.

== Gallery ==
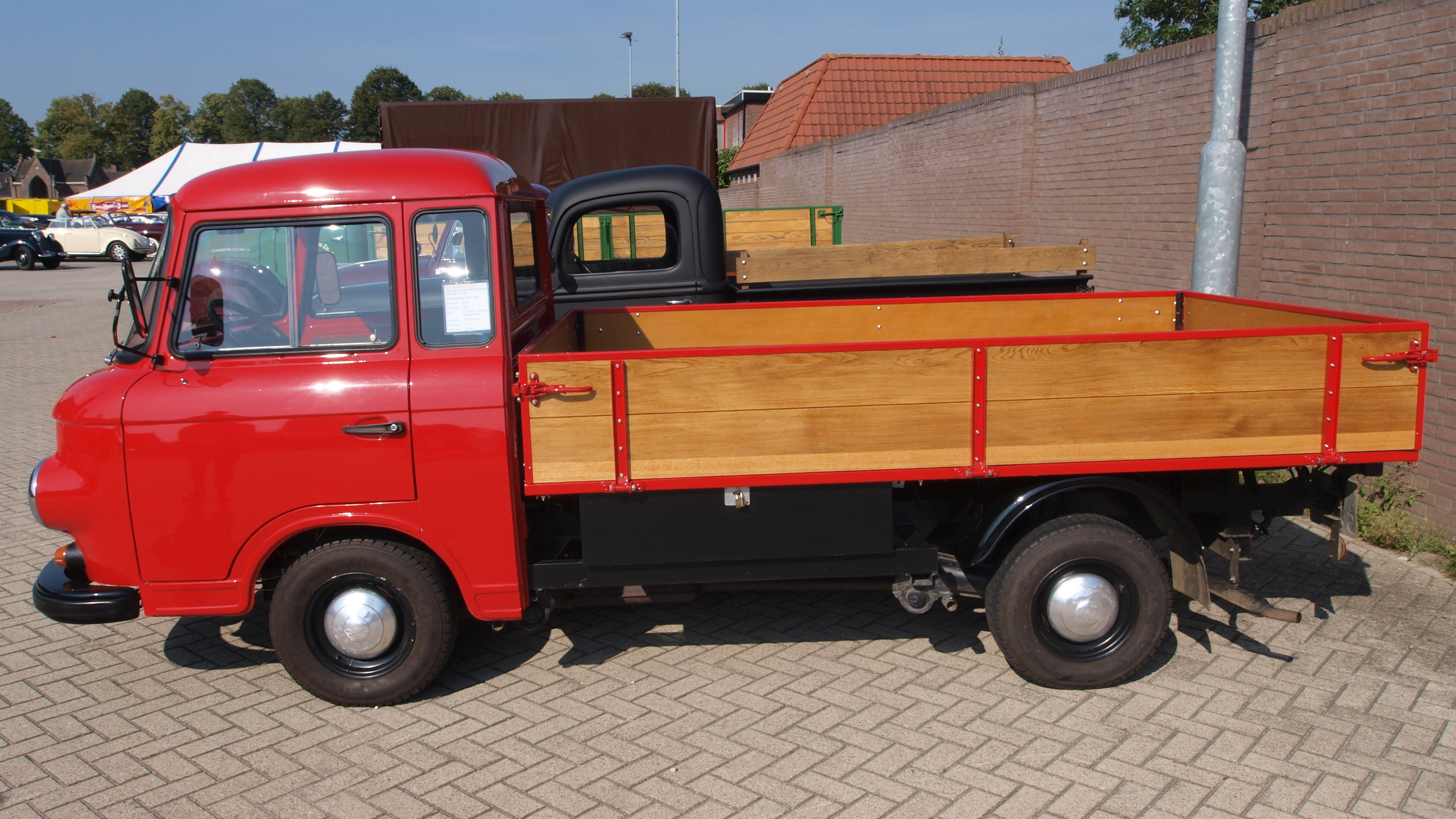
1965 B 1000 pickup truck

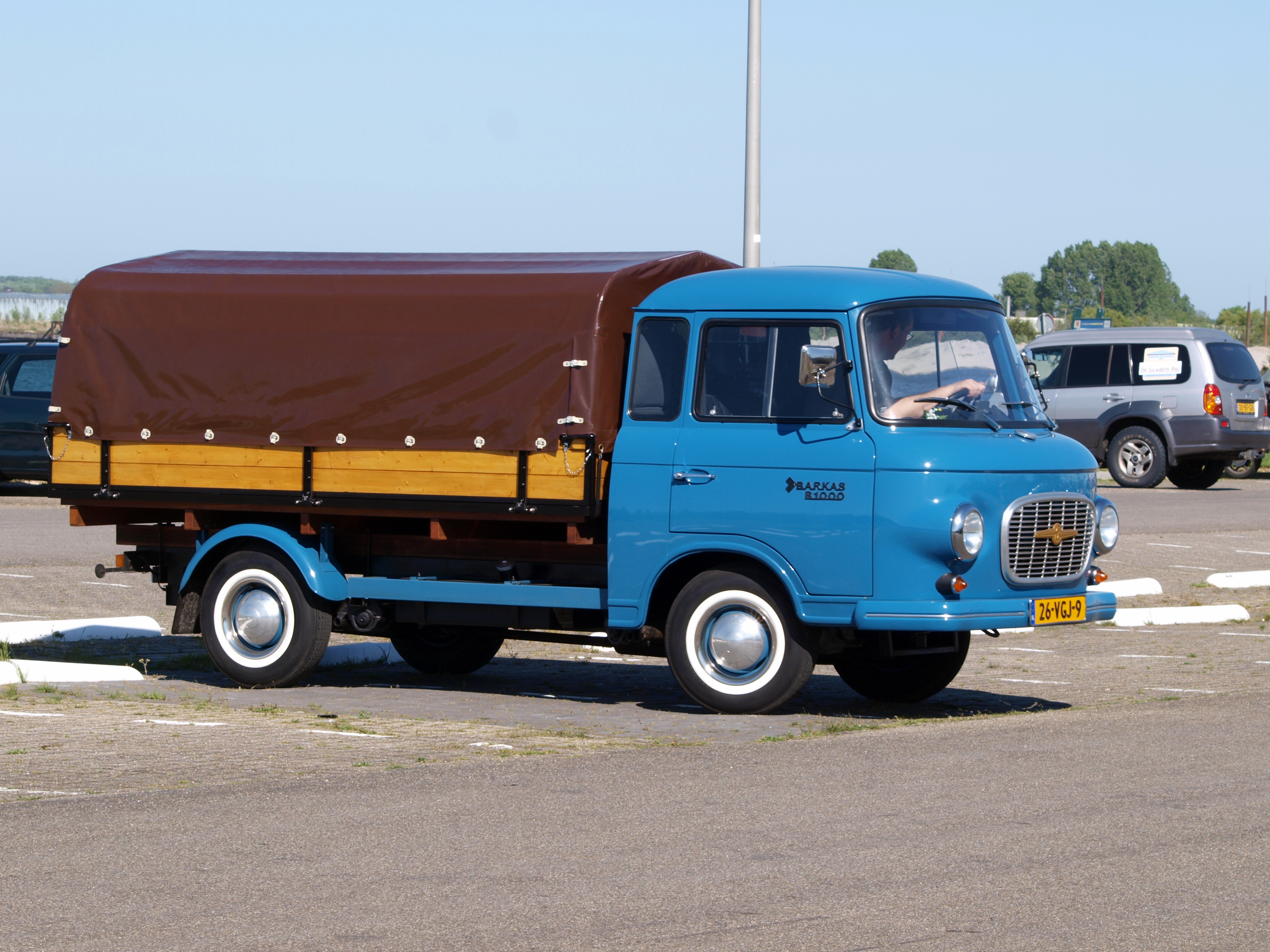
1981 B 1000 pickup truck with additional tarpaulin

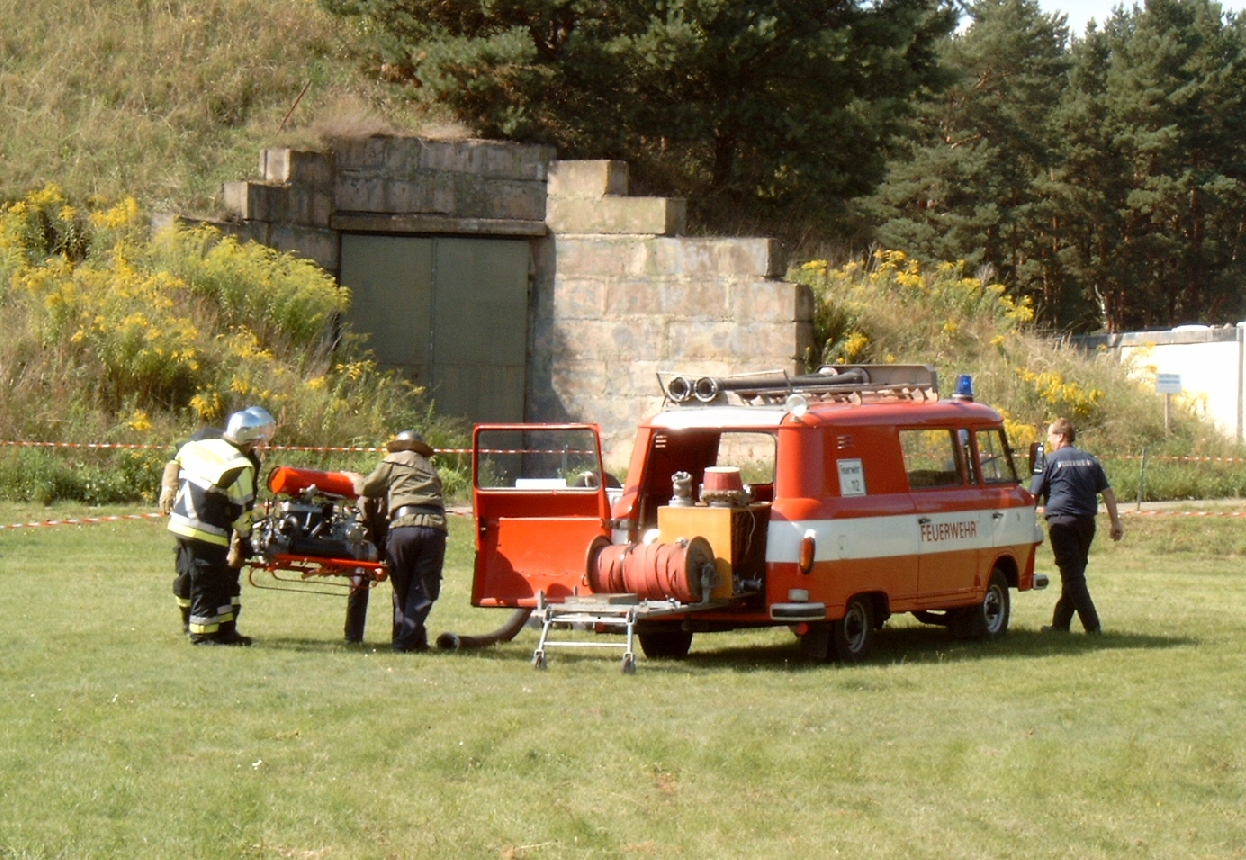
KLF 8 fire engine, well visible rear door

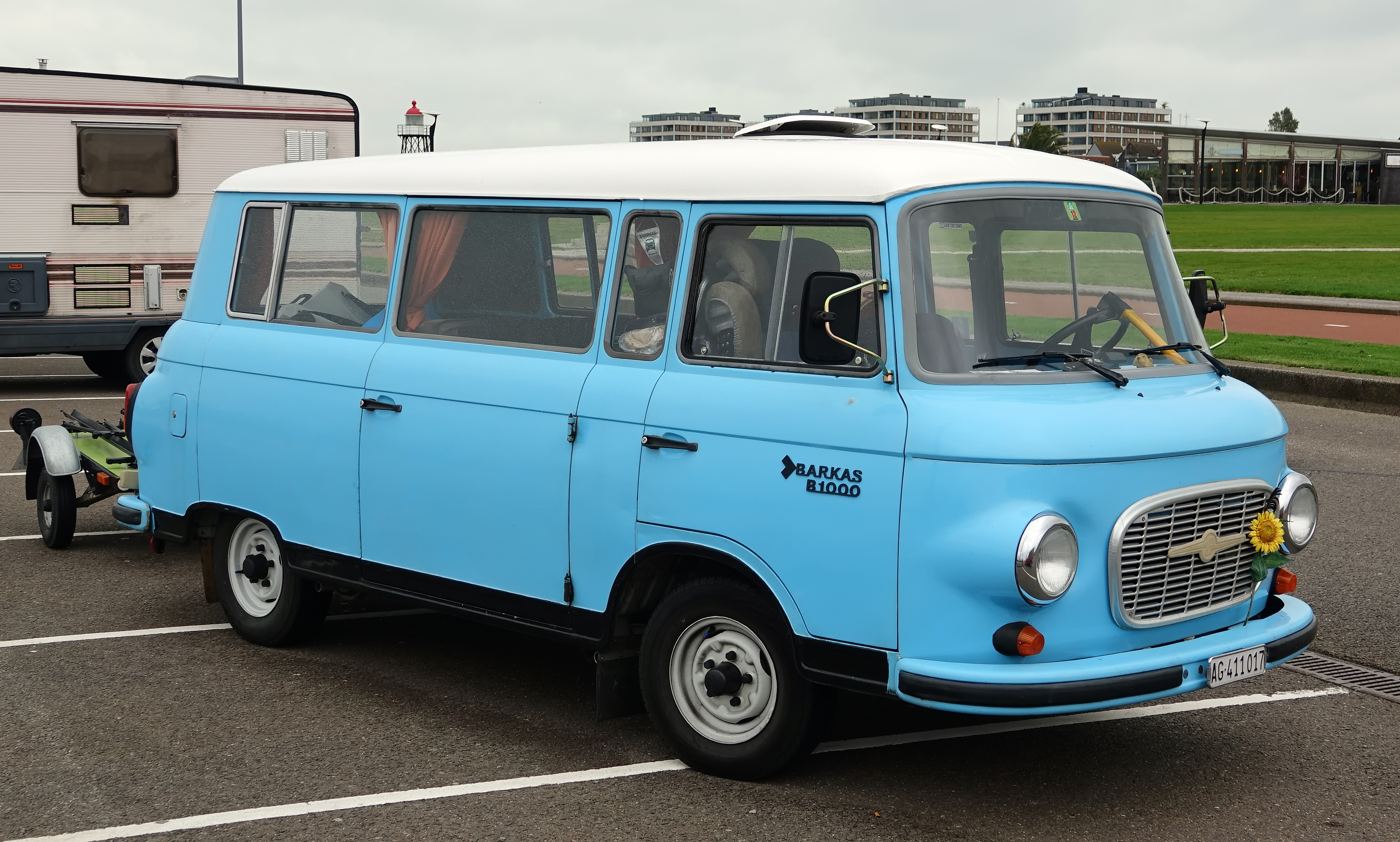
Minibus

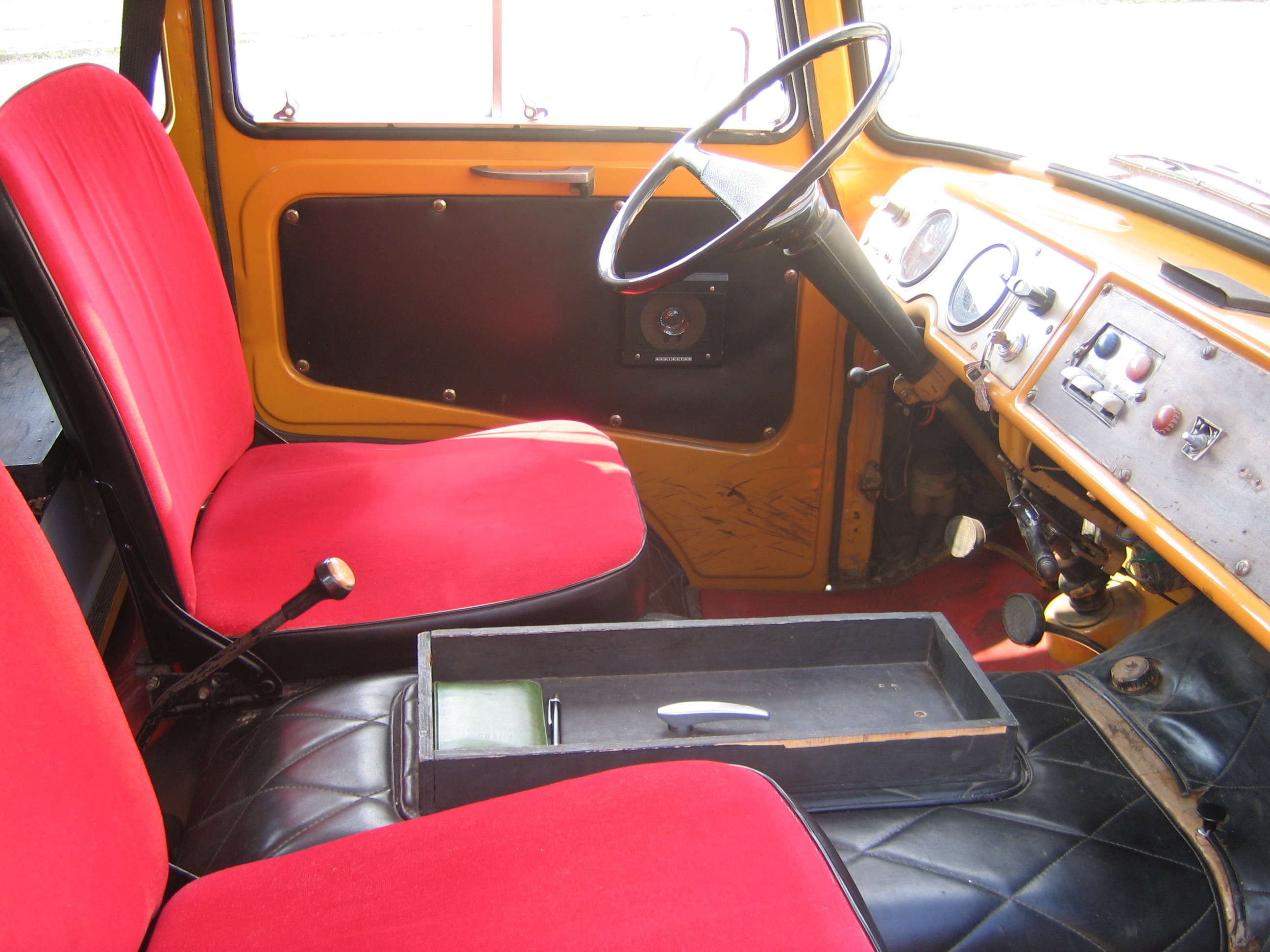
Interior

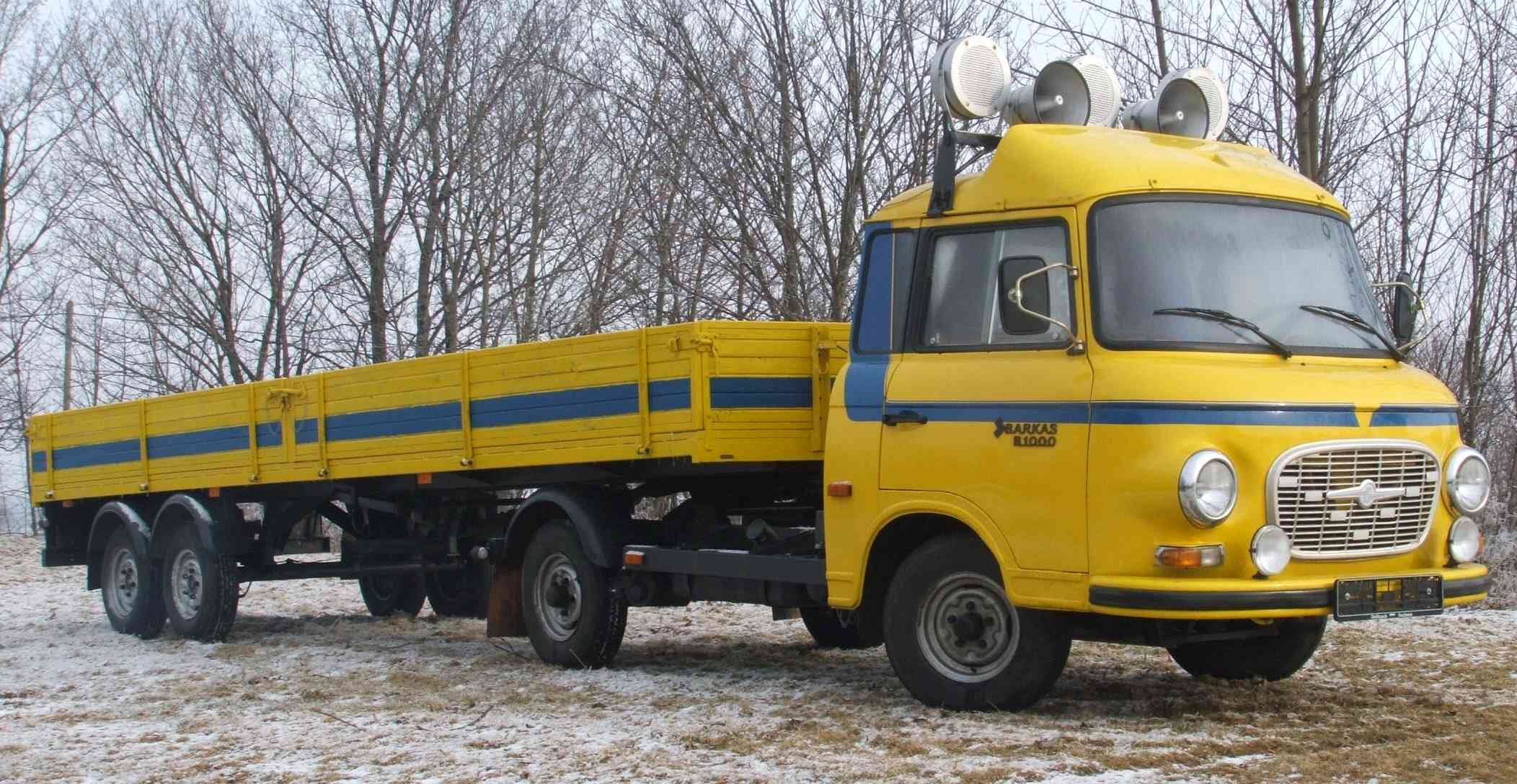
B 1000 semi

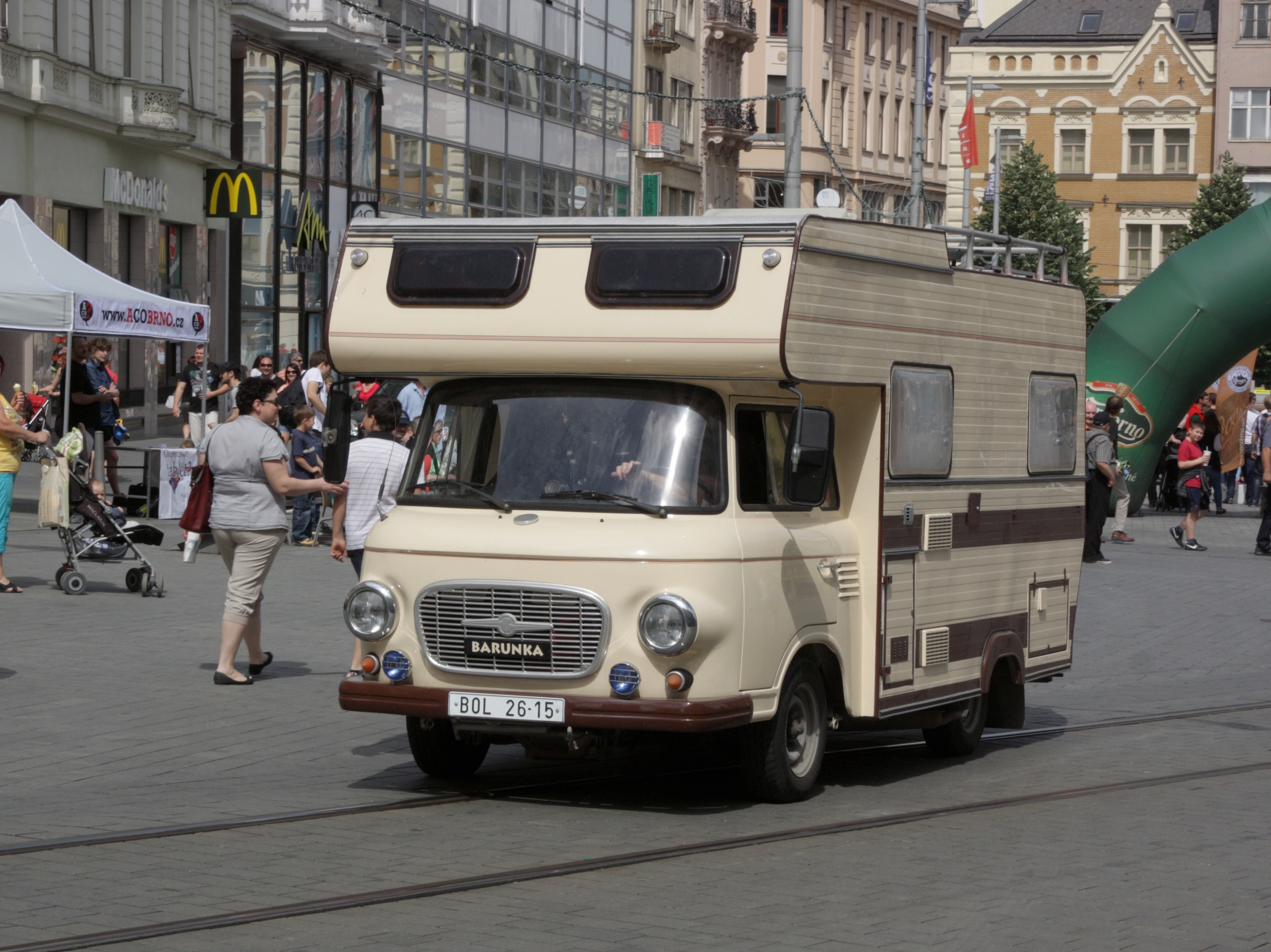
B 1000 motor home

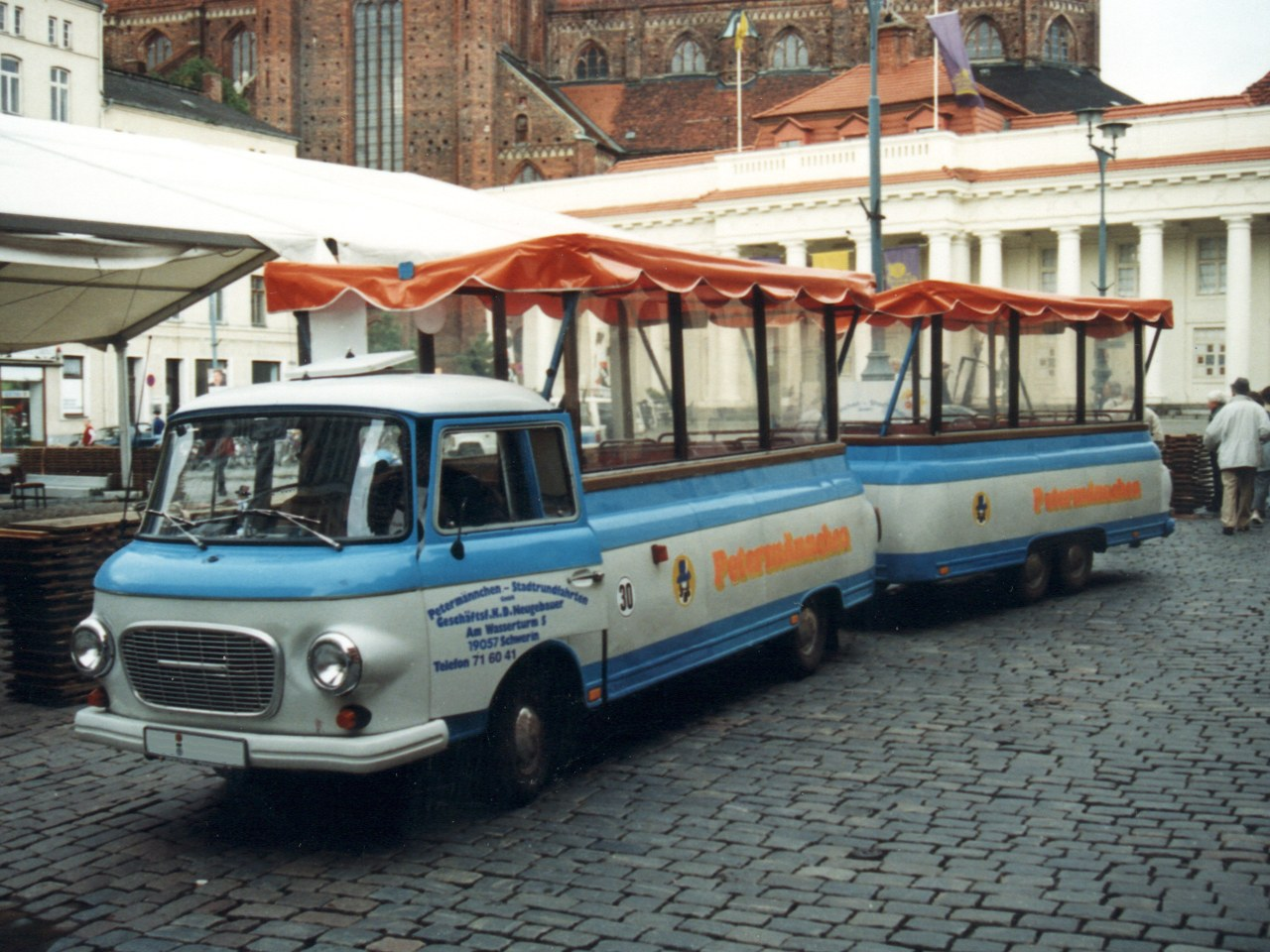
B 1000 cabriolet bus

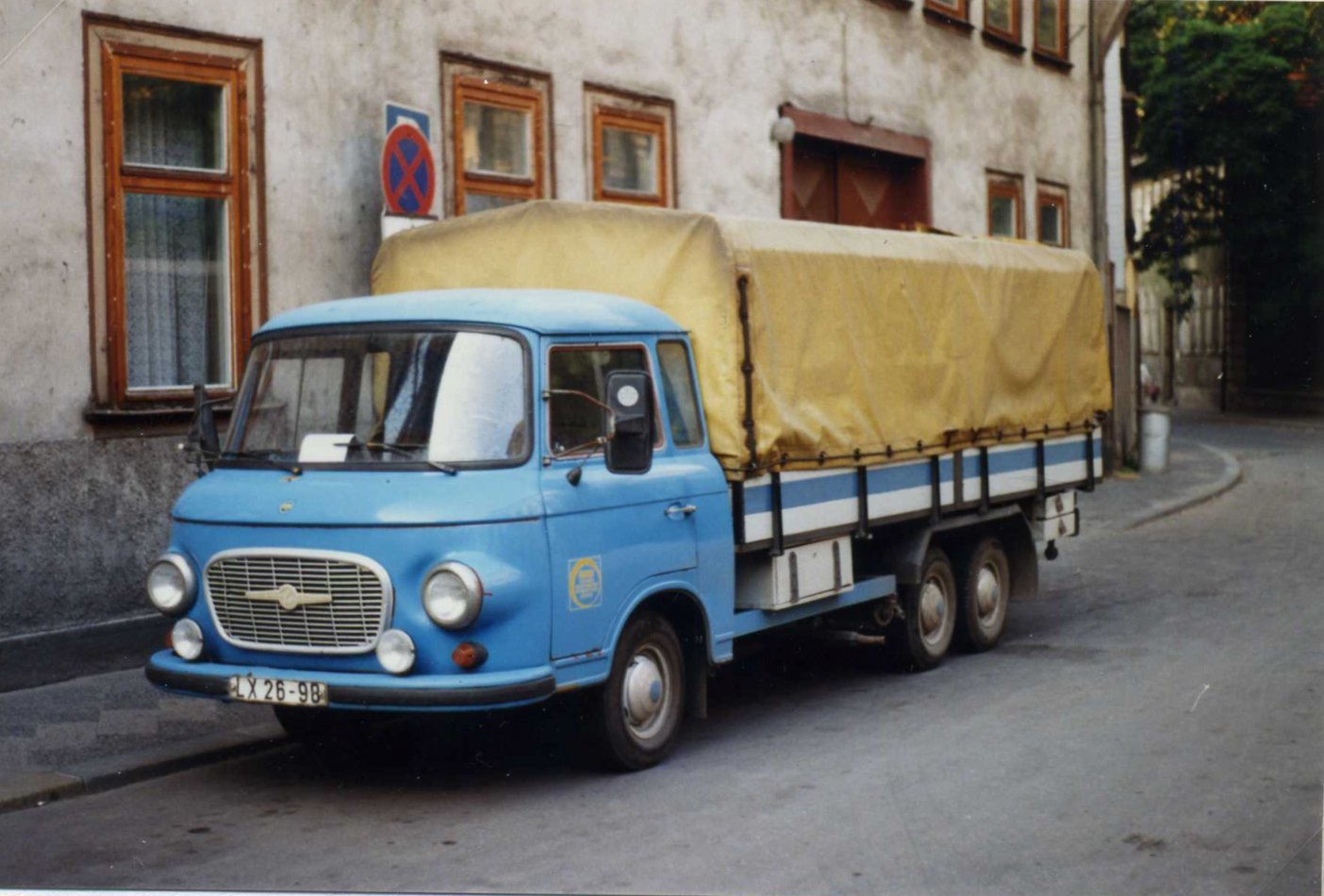
Three-axle truck based on a B 1000 chassis

== Bibliography ==
- Werner Oswald: Kraftfahrzeuge der DDR. 2nd edition. Motorbuch-Verlag, Stuttgart 2000, ISBN 3-613-01913-2, p. 199–205
