= Sam Barkas =

English footballer (1909–1989)

- Barkas in 1937

Personal information
- Full name: Samuel Barkas
- Date of birth: 29 December 1909
- Place of birth: Wardley Colliery, England
- Date of death: 10 December 1989 (aged 79)
- Height: 5 ft 9 in (1.75 m)
- Position: Left back

Youth career
- Middle Dock

Senior career*
Years	Team	Apps	(Gls)
1928–1933	Bradford City	202	(8)
1933–1946	Manchester City	176	(1)

International career
1936–1937	England	5	(0)

Managerial career
- Workington
- 1957: Wigan Athletic
- * Club domestic league appearances and goals

Samuel Barkas (29 December 1909 – 10 December 1989) was an English football player and manager who played at left back for Bradford City and Manchester City.

== Career ==
Born in Wardley Colliery, England, Barkas had worked in the pits and farm before leaving his junior club Middle Dock to join Bradford City in 1928. He played four games in his first season, before in his first full season in 1928–29 he helped City to the Division Three (North) title. He played a total of 202 games for City before he was sold to Manchester City for £5,000 in 1933.

At Manchester City he picked up a Championship medal and a Division Two title. He played until 1946 appearing 176 times and scoring one goal.

He also won five caps for England and captained his country three times.

He later managed Workington and Wigan and was a scout for Manchester City and Leeds United.

== Family ==
Barkas was one of five brothers who all had professional careers; the others were Ned, Harry, Jimmy and Tommy. His cousin Billy Felton played for Sheffield Wednesday, Manchester City and Tottenham Hotspur and made one appearance for England.

== Honours ==
=== Player ===
Bradford City

- Football League Third Division North: 1928–29

Manchester City

- Football League Championship: 1936–37
- Football League Second Division: 1946–47
