= Bethe formula =

Moving charge energy loss formula found by Hans Bethe

The Bethe formula or Bethe–Bloch formula describes the mean energy loss per distance travelled of swift charged particles (protons, alpha particles, atomic ions) traversing matter (or alternatively the stopping power of the material). For electrons the energy loss is slightly different due to their small mass (requiring relativistic corrections) and their indistinguishability, and since they suffer much larger losses by Bremsstrahlung, terms must be added to account for this. Fast charged particles moving through matter interact with the electrons of atoms in the material. The interaction excites or ionizes the atoms, leading to an energy loss of the traveling particle.

The non-relativistic version was found by Hans Bethe in 1930; the relativistic version (shown below) was found by him in 1932. The most probable energy loss differs from the mean energy loss and is described by the Landau–Vavilov distribution.

== The formula ==
For a particle with speed v, charge z (in multiples of the electron charge), and energy E, traveling a distance x into a target of electron number density n and mean excitation energy I (see below), the relativistic version of the formula reads, in SI units:

| $- \left\langle\frac{dE}{dx}\right\rangle = \frac{4 \pi}{m_e c^2} \cdot \frac{nz^2}{\beta^2} \cdot \left(\frac{e^2}{4\pi\varepsilon_0}\right)^2 \cdot \left[\ln \left(\frac{2m_e c^2 \beta^2}{I \cdot (1-\beta^2)}\right) - \beta^2\right]$ | 1 |

where c is the speed of light and ε_{0} the vacuum permittivity, $\beta = \frac{v}{c}$, e and m_{e} the electron charge and rest mass respectively.

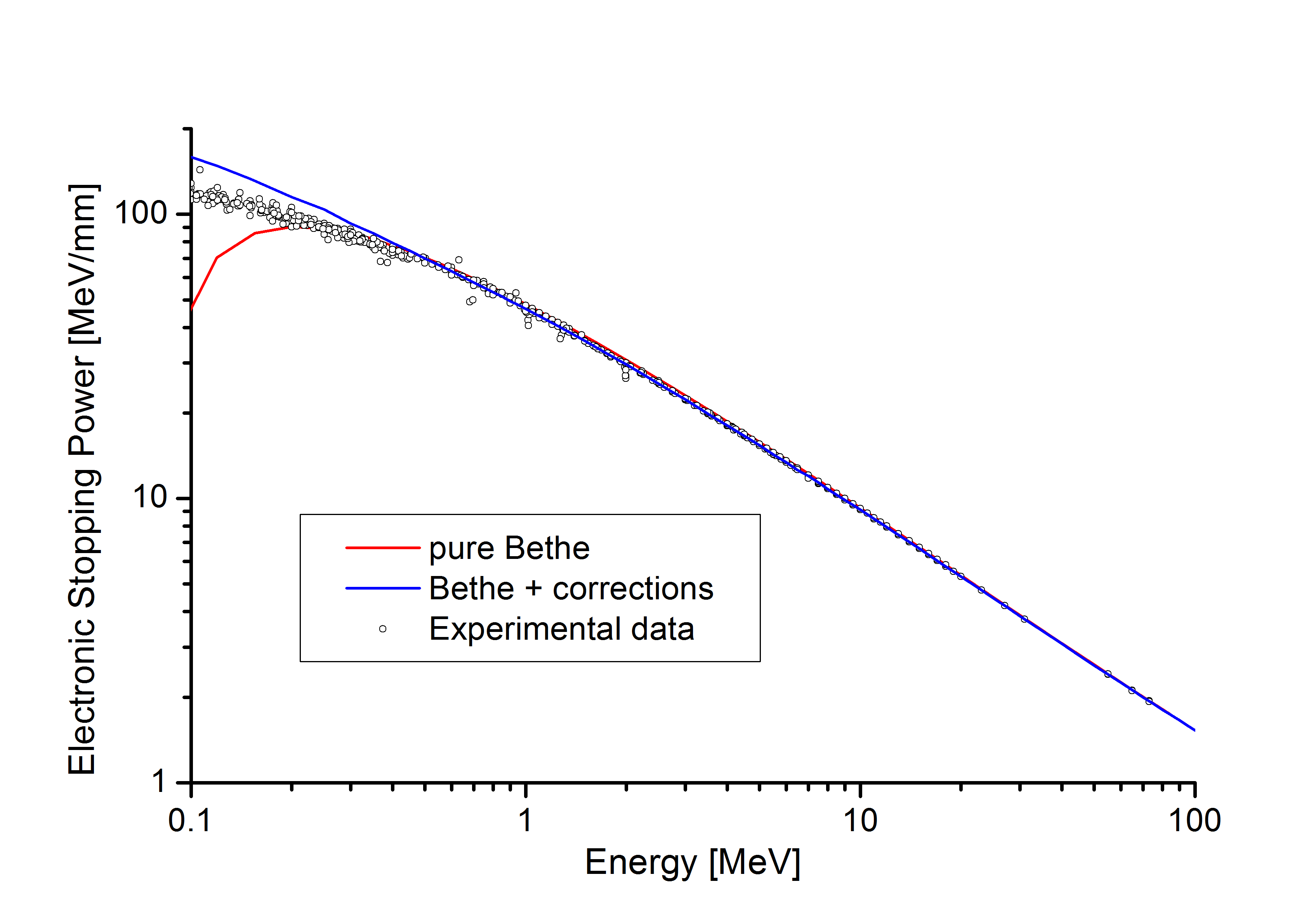
Stopping Power of Aluminum for Protons versus proton energy, and the Bethe formula without (red) and with corrections (blue)

Here, the electron density of the material can be calculated by

$$n=\frac{N_{A}\cdot Z\cdot\rho}{A\cdot M_{u}}\,,$$

where ρ is the density of the material, Z its atomic number, A its relative atomic mass, N_{A} the Avogadro number and M_{u} the Molar mass constant.

In the figure to the right, the small circles are experimental results obtained from measurements of various authors, while the red curve is Bethe's formula. Evidently, Bethe's theory agrees very well with experiment at high energy. The agreement is even better when corrections are applied (see below).

For low energies, i.e., for small velocities of the particle β << 1, the Bethe formula reduces to

| $- \frac{dE}{dx} = \frac{4 \pi nz^2}{m_e v^2} \cdot \left(\frac{e^2}{4\pi\varepsilon_0}\right)^2 \cdot \left[\ln \left(\frac{2m_e v^2 }{I}\right)\right].$ | 2 |

This can be seen by first replacing βc by v in eq. (1) and then neglecting β^{2} because of its small size.

At low energy, the energy loss according to the Bethe formula therefore decreases approximately as v^{−2} with increasing energy. It reaches a minimum for approximately E = 3Mc^{2}, where M is the mass of the particle (for protons, this would be about at 3000 MeV). For highly relativistic cases β ≈ 1, the energy loss increases again, logarithmically due to the transversal component of the electric field.

== The mean excitation energy ==
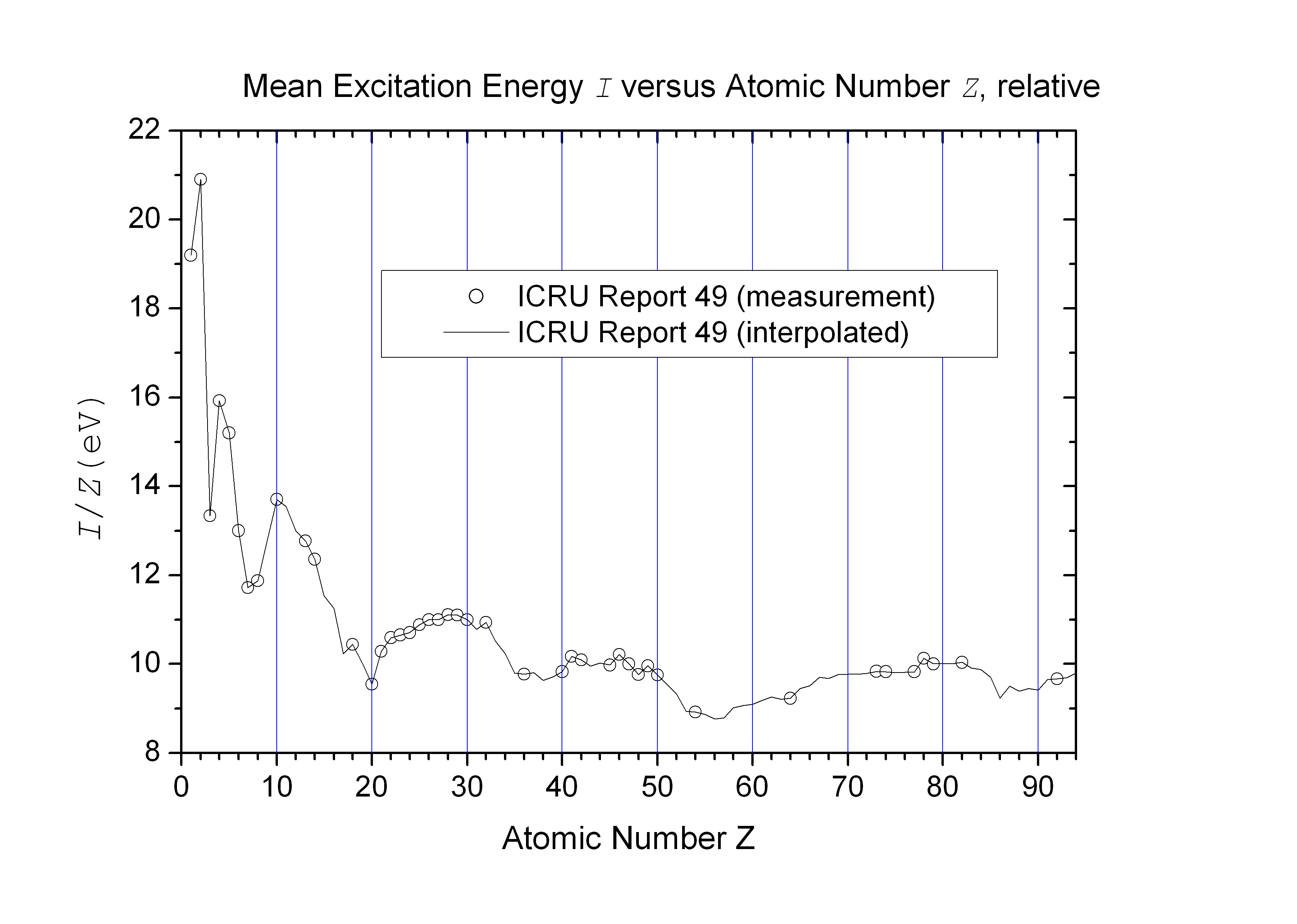
The mean excitation energy I of atoms, versus atomic number Z, in eV, divided by Z

In the Bethe theory, the material is completely described by a single number, the mean excitation energy I. In 1933 Felix Bloch showed that the mean excitation energy of atoms is approximately given by

| $I = (10~\mathrm{eV}) \cdot Z$ | 3 |

where Z is the atomic number of the atoms of the material. If this approximation is introduced into formula (1) above, one obtains an expression which is often called Bethe-Bloch formula. But since we have now accurate tables of I as a function of Z (see below), the use of such a table will yield better results than the use of formula (3).

The figure shows normalized values of I, taken from a table. The peaks and valleys in this figure lead to corresponding valleys and peaks in the stopping power. These are called "Z_{2}-oscillations" or "Z_{2}-structure" (where Z_{2} = Z means the atomic number of the target).

== Corrections to the Bethe formula ==
The Bethe formula is only valid for energies high enough so that the charged atomic particle (the ion) does not carry any atomic electrons with it. At smaller energies, when the ion carries electrons, this reduces its charge effectively, and the stopping power is thus reduced. But even if the atom is fully ionized, corrections are necessary. For example, the formula becomes inaccurate for protons with energies less than about 0.2 MeV.

Bethe found his formula using quantum mechanical perturbation theory. Hence, his result is proportional to the square of the charge z of the particle. The description can be improved by considering corrections which correspond to higher powers of z. These are: the Barkas–Andersen effect (proportional to z^{3}, after Walter H. Barkas and Hans Henrik Andersen), and the Bloch correction (proportional to z^{4}). In addition, one has to take into account that the atomic electrons of the material traversed are not stationary (shell correction).

The corrections mentioned have been built into the programs PSTAR and ASTAR, for example, by which one can calculate the stopping power for protons and alpha particles. The corrections are large at low energy and become smaller and smaller as energy is increased.

At very high energies, Enrico Fermi's density correction has to be added.

== See also ==
- Stopping power (particle radiation)
- Landau distribution
- Hans Bethe
