= Tommy Barkas =

English footballer

Personal information
- Date of birth: 27 March 1912
- Place of birth: Gateshead, England
- Date of death: 1991 (aged 78–79)
- Height: 5 ft 6 in (1.68 m)
- Position: Inside forward

Senior career*
Years	Team	Apps	(Gls)
1933–1934	Bradford City	16	(2)
1934–1946	Halifax Town	171	(35)
1946–1948	Rochdale	44	(17)
1948–1949	Stockport County	44	(18)
1949	Carlisle United	14	(5)
- * Club domestic league appearances and goals

Tommy Barkas, BEM (27 March 1912 – 1991) was an English professional footballer who played in England during the 1930s and 1940s.

Born in Gateshead, England, Barkas was one five brothers, including Ned, Harry, Jimmy and Sam, who all had professional careers. A cousin, Billy Felton, also played for England. He played in the Football League for Bradford City, Halifax Town, Rochdale, Stockport County and Carlisle United, and he made almost 300 League appearances in total, including 171 for Halifax.

During the Second World War he joined the Royal Air Force and earned the British Empire Medal (Military) whilst serving in Malta. The official account of the events leading to the award read "Corporal Barkas, along with Acting Flight Sergeant Hugh Shelly Stammuitz of Ozshott, dealt with numerous fires including those on a petrol bowser and an ammunition lorry while some 50 enemy aircraft were bombing the area".

He retired from football in 1949, having played 14 league games for Carlisle in the 1948-49 season.
