= Hans Henrik Andersen =

Hans Henrik Andersen (May 1, 1937 – November 3, 2012) was a professor at the Niels Bohr Institute at the University of Copenhagen (emeritus since 2004). He was the founder and subsequently co-editor of the scientific journal "Nuclear Instruments and Methods in Physics Research B".

Andersen was born in Frederiksberg, Denmark.

He has made important contributions to various fields of atomic physics and solid state physics, especially in the field of the stopping power of matter for fast charged particles. The accuracy (0.3–0.5%) of his measurements is unsurpassed even today (2006). They were done by measuring the amount of heat deposited in a foil at the temperature of liquid helium (−269 °C).

Together with his collaborators, he succeeded in showing in 1969 that the stopping power for fast alpha particles is more than four times as large as that for protons. Since the atomic number (Z) of alpha particles is exactly twice as big as that of protons, that means that the stopping power is not exactly proportional to Z^{2}, as the simple Bethe formula would have it. That was an additional proof of the existence of the Barkas effect.

== Literature ==
- Andersen, H.H.; Simonsen, H.; Sørensen, H. (1969). "An experimental investigation of charge-dependent deviations from the Bethe stopping power formula". Nuclear Physics A. 125: 171. Bibcode:1969NuPhA.125..171A. doi:10.1016/0375-9474(69)90836-7.
- Sigmund, P. (2006). Particle Penetration and Radiation Effects. Springer Series in Solid State Sciences. Vol. 151. Springer-Verlag. ISBN 978-3-540-72622-7.
