= Walter H. Barkas =

North American physicist

Walter Henry Barkas (2 September 1912 – 28 March 1969) was professor of physics at the University of California, Riverside beginning in 1965. He specialized in the use of nuclear emulsions, i.e., photographic plates having a thick sensitive layer, for purposes of Particle physics.

Together with his collaborators, he discovered the difference in range between positive and negative mesons of the same initial energy, and he ascribed this effect to the difference in stopping power between positively and negatively charged particles. Hence, this difference is called Barkas effect or Barkas-Andersen effect, see Bethe formula.

Barkas was a visiting scholar at the Institute for Advanced Study in 1938-40. In 1941 he was elected as Fellow of the American Physical Society.

== Biography ==
He was born on 2 September 1912 in Portland, Oregon to Leander Henrikson Barkas and Ester Emilia Gustafsson. He became a professor of physics at the University of California, Riverside in 1965. He died on 28 March 1969 in Riverside, California.

== Literature ==
- Barkas W.H., Dyer J.N., Heckmann H.H.: "Resolution of the Σ^{−}-mass anomaly", Physical Review Letters 11 (1963) 26
- Sigmund P.: "Particle Penetration and Radiation Effects, General Aspects and Stopping of Swift Point Charges", Springer Series in Solid State Sciences Vol. 151, Springer Berlin Heidelberg (2006)
- he co wrote Data for elementary-particle physics published by the University of California Radiation Laboratory, 1958.
