= Mellissa Channell-Watkins =

Canadian ice hockey player (born 1994)

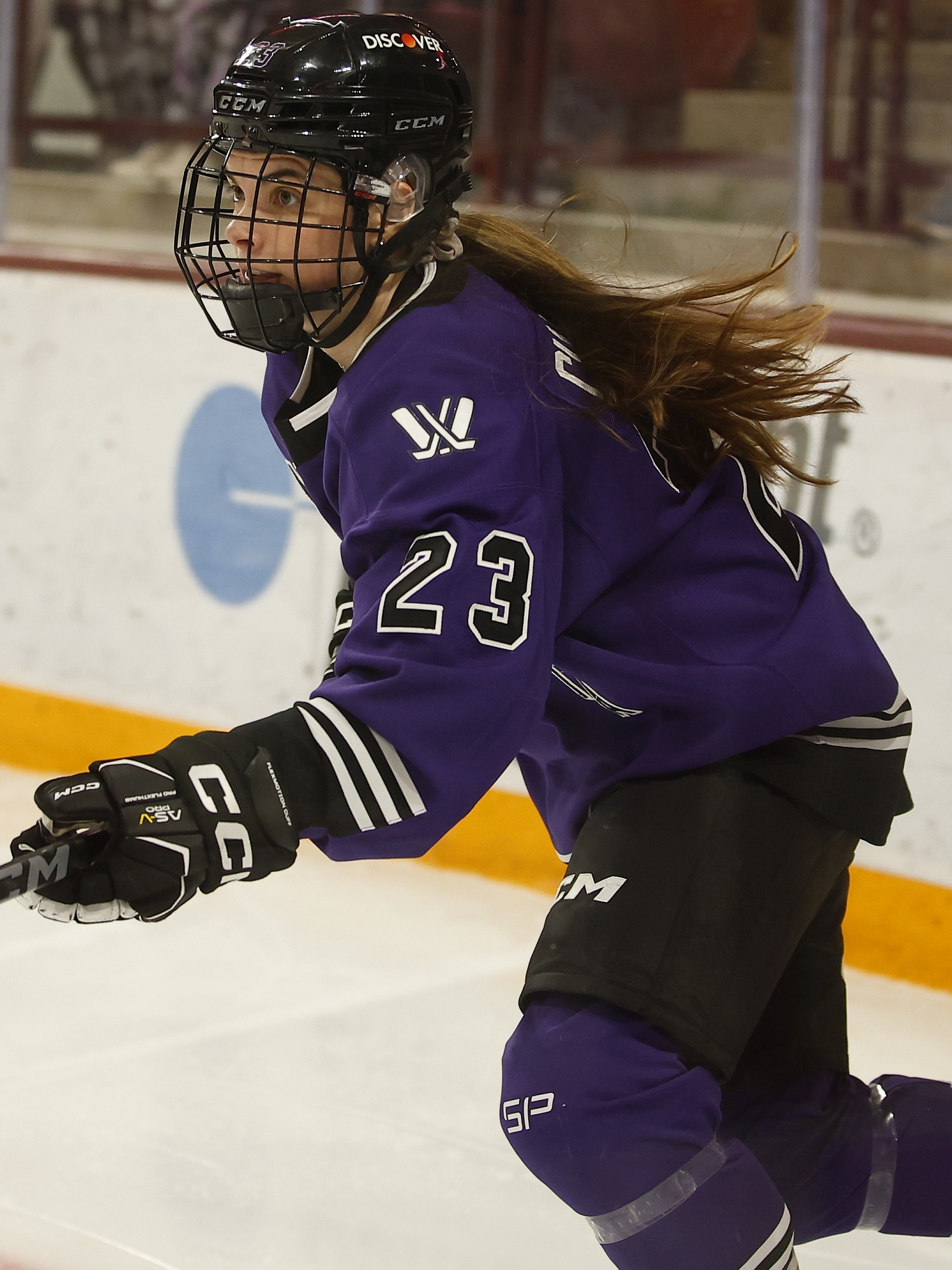
- Channell with PWHL Minnesota in 2024
- Born: December 16, 1994 (age 31) Everett, Washington, US
- Height: 5 ft 4 in (163 cm)
- Weight: 130 lb (59 kg; 9 st 4 lb)
- Position: Defence
- Shoots: Left
- PWHL team Former teams: Detroit Clutch; Vancouver Goldeneyes; Minnesota Frost; Toronto Furies
- Playing career: 2013–present

Mellissa Channell-Watkins (born December 16, 1994) is an American-Canadian professional ice hockey player who is a defender for the Detroit Clutch of the Professional Women's Hockey League (PWHL). She previously played for the Minnesota Frost and Vancouver Goldeneyes of the PWHL and the Toronto Furies of the Canadian Women's Hockey League (CWHL). She played college ice hockey at Wisconsin.

== Early life ==
Channell was born in Everett, Washington and moved to Michigan at a young age. She moved to Seattle for grades four and five, and then later back to Michigan. She played two years with the Detroit Little Caesars U-16 program, and one year with the Little Caesar's U-19 team that won the state championship her freshman year of high school. In grades 11 and 12, she moved to Oakville, Ontario. She then played for the Burlington Barracudas of the Provincial Women's Hockey League for two seasons, where she recorded seven goals and 30 assists in 57 games.

== Playing career ==
=== College ===
Channell began her collegiate career with the Wisconsin Badgers during the 2013–14 season. During her freshman year, she appeared in all 38 games and recorded two goals and ten assists. During the 2014–15 season, in her sophomore year, she recorded three goals and 17 assists in 36 games. During the 2015–16 season, in her junior year, she recorded three goals and 12 assists in 37 games. During the 2016–17 season, in her senior year, she recorded three goals and 14 assists in 36 games. On March 17, 2017, during the 2017 NCAA Frozen Four semifinal game against Boston College, she scored the game-winning goal with 17 seconds remaining to send Wisconsin to the championship game.

=== Professional ===
Channell was drafted 11th overall by the Connecticut Whale in the 2016 NWHL Draft. After not signing with the Whale, she was drafted 14th overall by the Toronto Furies in the 2018 CWHL Draft. During the 2018–19 season, she recorded 12 assists in 28 games. She then played four seasons in the Professional Women's Hockey Players Association (PWHPA).

On September 18, 2023, Channell was drafted in the tenth round, 59th overall, by PWHL Toronto in the 2023 PWHL draft. After being placed on waivers by Toronto, she signed a one-year contract with PWHL Minnesota on December 22, 2023. During the 2023–24 season, she recorded two assists in 24 regular season games and five assists in ten playoff games. During game five of the Walter Cup finals against PWHL Boston, she recorded three assists in the game to help Minnesota win the inaugural Walter Cup. She became the first PWHL player to record three assists in a postseason game. Her three assists in the game exceeded her regular-season point total. During the 2024–25 season, she recorded one goal and six assists in 29 games during the regular season. During the 2025 PWHL playoffs she recorded one goal and four assists in eight games to help the Frost win their second consecutive Walter Cup.

On June 17, 2025, Channell-Watkins signed a one-year contract with the Vancouver Goldeneyes. During the 2025–26 season, she recorded two assists in 30 games. On June 21, 2026, she signed a two-year contract with the Detroit Clutch.

== Personal life ==
Channell is the daughter of former professional ice hockey player and current scout Craig Channell.

Channell married Colin Watkins on June 22, 2024.

== Career statistics ==
Note: GP = Games played; G = Goals; A = Assists; Pts = Points; PIM = Penalty minutes;

			Regular season					Playoffs
Season	Team	League	GP	G	A	Pts	PIM	GP	G	A	Pts	PIM
2013–14	University of Wisconsin	WCHA	38	2	10	12	18	—	—	—	—	—
2014–15	University of Wisconsin	WCHA	36	3	17	20	22	—	—	—	—	—
2015–16	University of Wisconsin	WCHA	37	3	12	15	30	—	—	—	—	—
2016–17	University of Wisconsin	WCHA	36	3	14	17	20	—	—	—	—	—
2018–19	Toronto Furies	CWHL	28	0	12	12	16	3	0	1	1	2
2021–22	Team Minnesota	PWHPA	3	1	1	2	0	—	—	—	—	—
2022–23	Team Harvey's	PWHPA	14	0	0	0	0	—	—	—	—	—
2023–24	PWHL Minnesota	PWHL	24	0	2	2	0	10	0	5	5	2
2024–25	Minnesota Frost	PWHL	29	1	6	7	2	8	1	4	5	0
2025–26	Vancouver Goldeneyes	PWHL	30	0	2	2	4	—	—	—	—	—
CWHL totals			28	0	12	12	16	3	0	1	1	2
PWHPA totals			14	0	0	0	0	—	—	—	—	—
PWHL totals			83	1	10	11	6	18	1	9	10	2

== Awards and honours ==
Honors	Year
PWHL
Walter Cup Champion	2024, 2025
