= Craig Channell =

Canadian ice hockey player and scout

- Born: April 24, 1962 (age 63) Vancouver, British Columbia, Canada
- Height: 5 ft 11 in (180 cm)
- Weight: 195 lb (88 kg; 13 st 13 lb)
- Position: Defence
- Shot: Left
- Played for: AHL; Sherbrooke Jets; Sherbrooke Canadiens; IHL; Fort Wayne Komets; Indianapolis Ice
- NHL draft: Undrafted
- Playing career: 1982–1990

Craig Channell (born April 24, 1962) is a Canadian former professional ice hockey player and current scout.

== Career ==
Following the 1989–90 season, Channell retired to become the head amateur scout for the Washington Capitals of the National Hockey League. He is currently an amateur scout with the New York Rangers.

== Personal life ==
Channell's daughter, Mellissa Channell, is a professional ice hockey player for PWHL Minnesota.

== Career statistics ==
			Regular season					Playoffs
Season	Team	League	GP	G	A	Pts	PIM	GP	G	A	Pts	PIM
1979–80	Seattle Breakers	WHL	70	3	21	24	191	12	0	0	0	21
1980–81	Seattle Breakers	WHL	71	9	66	75	181	5	0	2	2	4
1981–82	Seattle Breakers	WHL	71	9	79	88	244	10	0	11	11	22
1982–83	Sherbrooke Jets	AHL	65	0	15	15	109	—	—	—	—	—
1983–84	Sherbrooke Jets	AHL	80	5	18	23	112	—	—	—	—	—
1984–85	Sherbrooke Canadiens	AHL	1	0	0	0	0	—	—	—	—	—
1984–85	Fort Wayne Komets	IHL	78	10	35	45	110	8	0	5	5	33
1985–86	Fort Wayne Komets	IHL	69	7	28	35	116	15	3	12	15	41
1986–87	Fort Wayne Komets	IHL	81	12	42	54	90	11	2	1	3	29
1987–88	Fort Wayne Komets	IHL	81	11	29	40	108	6	0	1	1	15
1988–89	Fort Wayne Komets	IHL	79	5	25	30	168	11	0	7	7	32
1989–90	Fort Wayne Komets	IHL	37	6	11	17	86	—	—	—	—	—
1989–90	Indianapolis Ice	IHL	16	0	1	1	17	14	1	1	2	16
AHL totals			146	5	33	38	221	—	—	—	—	—
IHL totals			441	51	171	222	695	65	6	27	33	166
