= Fred Channell =

English footballer (1910–1976)

Personal information
- Full name: Frederick Charles Channell
- Date of birth: 6 May 1910
- Place of birth: Edmonton, England
- Date of death: 6 August 1976 (aged 66)
- Place of death: Clacton-On-Sea, England
- Position: Full back

Senior career*
Years	Team	Apps	(Gls)
1926-1928	Harwich & Parkeston		
- Haywards Heath
1930–1931	Tottenham Hotspur	0	(0)
1931–1931	Peterborough & Fletton United		
- Northfleet United
1933–1936	Tottenham Hotspur	95	(1)
- * Club domestic league appearances and goals

Frederick Charles Channell (6 May 1910 – 6 August 1976) was a professional footballer who played for Harwich & Parkeston, Haywards Heath, Peterborough & Fletton United, Northfleet United and Tottenham Hotspur.

== Football career ==
The full back started his playing career as an outside-left forward at Harwich & Parkeston before joining Haywards Heath Town. In 1930 Channell had his first spell at Tottenham. After a trial in 1931 at Clapton Orient he moved to Peterborough & Fletton United. He went on to play for the Spurs nursery club Northfleet United, Channell rejoined the Lilywhites in 1933 to go on to play 109 matches and scoring a single goal in all competitions for the White Hart Lane club.
