= Barkas (van manufacturer) =

East German vehicle manufacturer

VEB Barkas-Werke
- Type: State-owned
- Industry: Automotive
- Founded: 1958
- Defunct: 1990
- Headquarters: Karl-Marx-Stadt, East Germany
- Products: Automobiles

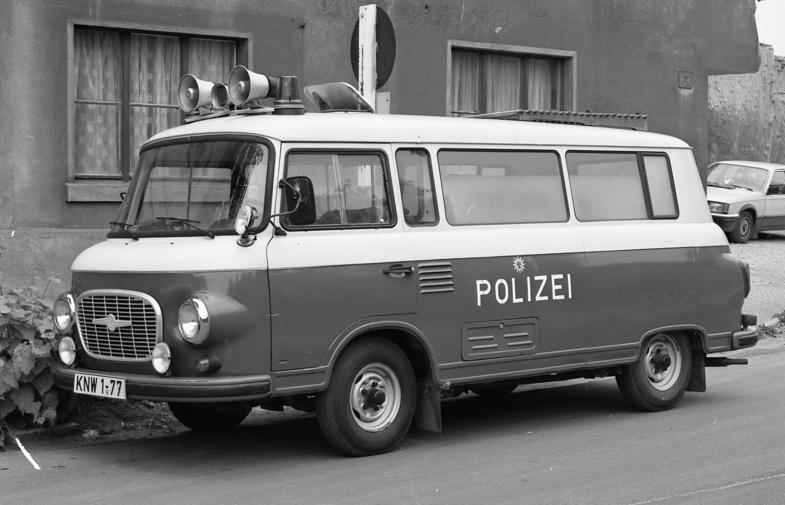
Former Volkspolizei Barkas B 1000 van

Barkas (VEB Barkas-Werke) was an East German manufacturer of small delivery vans and minibuses named the B 1000. In addition to delivery vans, Barkas also made engines for Trabant cars.

The van was built in a new factory in Chemnitz (then known as Karl-Marx-Stadt) on a site which was formerly home to the Framo car plant, the old Framo factory having been crated up and shipped to the Soviet Union as part of a larger war reparations package in the late 1940s. The business had subsequently been nationalized by the GDR government.

B 1000 production started in 1961 and continued until 1991. Originally the B 1000 was powered by the 45 PS three cylinder, two stroke DKW derived engine found also in contemporary Wartburgs. Shortly before production ceased, the model designation was changed to B 1000-1, and the old engine was replaced by a 1.3 four-stroke engine manufactured under licence from Volkswagen. The Belgian importer began installing a 1.8-litre (Endura-D) Ford diesel engine in the 1980s as the two-stroke was no longer competitive.

The B 1000 was a remarkable van at the time; the unusually high loading capacity, two-stroke engine, front wheel drive, and semi trailing arms suspension differed from the more traditionally constructed vans in the West. Being the only commercially available van in East Germany, the factory offered many body styles; a flatbed, a panel van, a people carrier, a box van, and an ambulance were all available.

Comparisons with the Volkswagen van of the early 1960s were inevitable. Its front-mounted engine made the Barkas easier to load and more variable in its configuration, with space for up to eight passenger seats. The vehicles were mostly produced for public service applications, with private customer delivery times in the 1960s stretching to heroic levels commonly associated with Trabants, of between ten and fourteen years.

Perhaps the most infamous alleged use of the B 1000 in the time of East Germany was by the feared Stasi state security forces as a covert prisoner transport vehicle, whereby up to five prisoners could be held in tiny, windowless cells in the rear of the vehicle. The vans were often used allegedly to snatch citizens directly from the street, and were usually disguised as food delivery trucks. Examples of vans configured in this way can be found on display at the former Stasi headquarters in Berlin, as well as the Hohenschönhausen prison used to hold political prisoners.

Altogether, 175,740 B 1000s and 1,961 B 1000-1s were built.

== See also ==
- Tempo Matador
- DKW Schnellaster
- VW T1

== Gallery ==
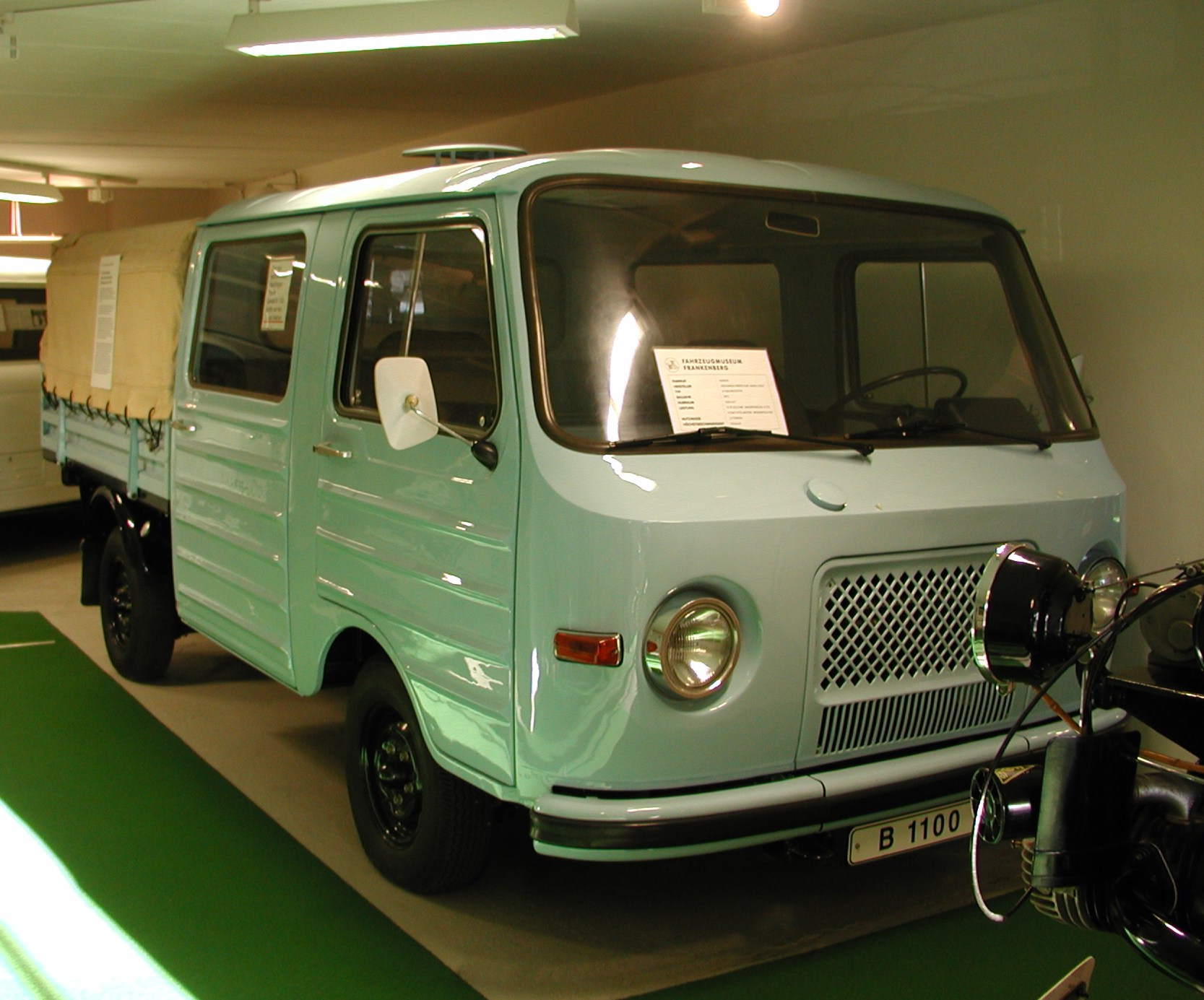
B 1100 prototype

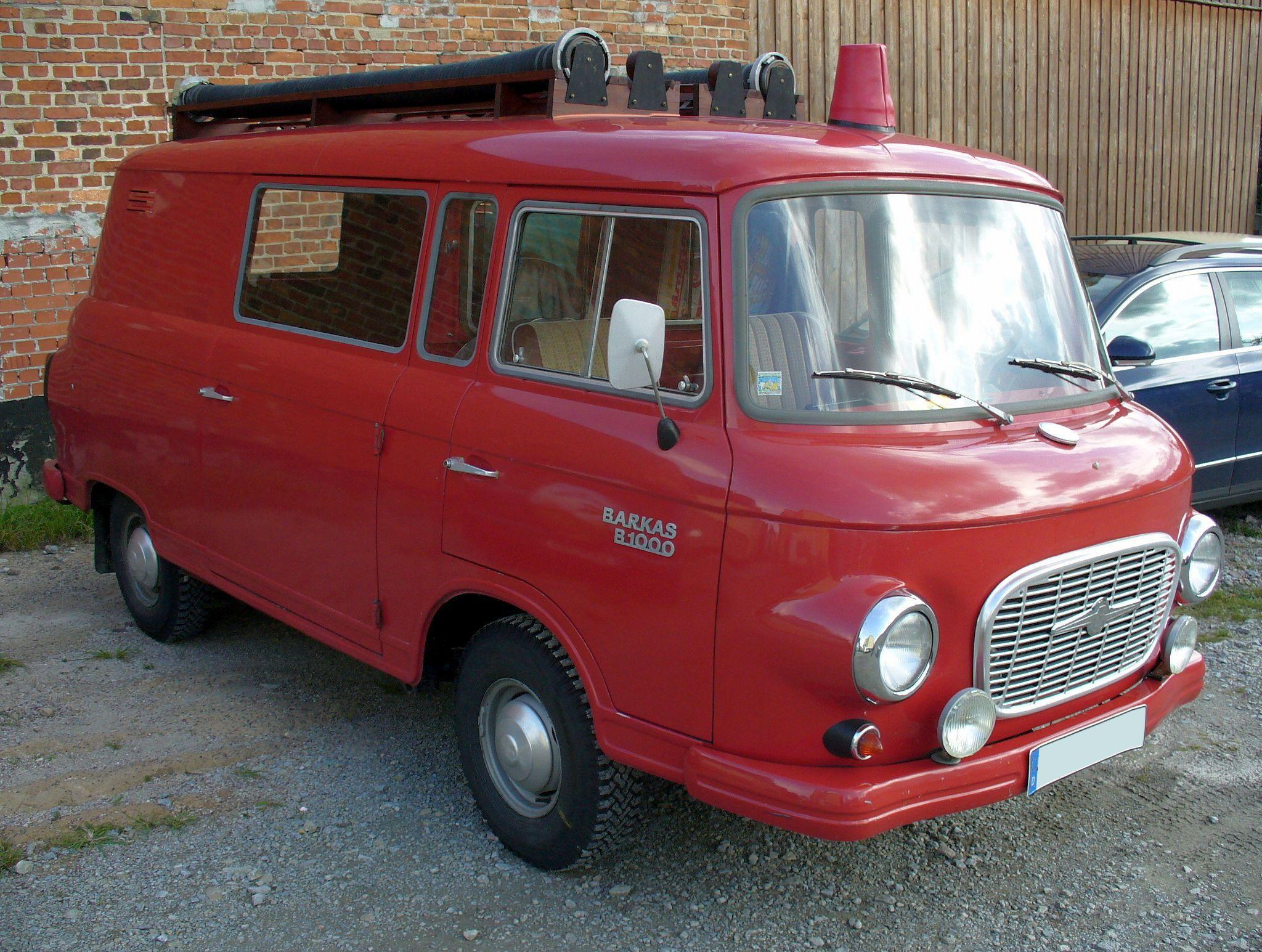
Fire engine

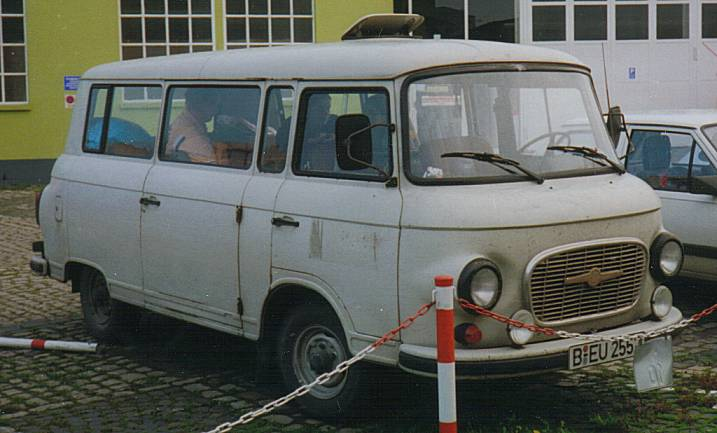
People carrier

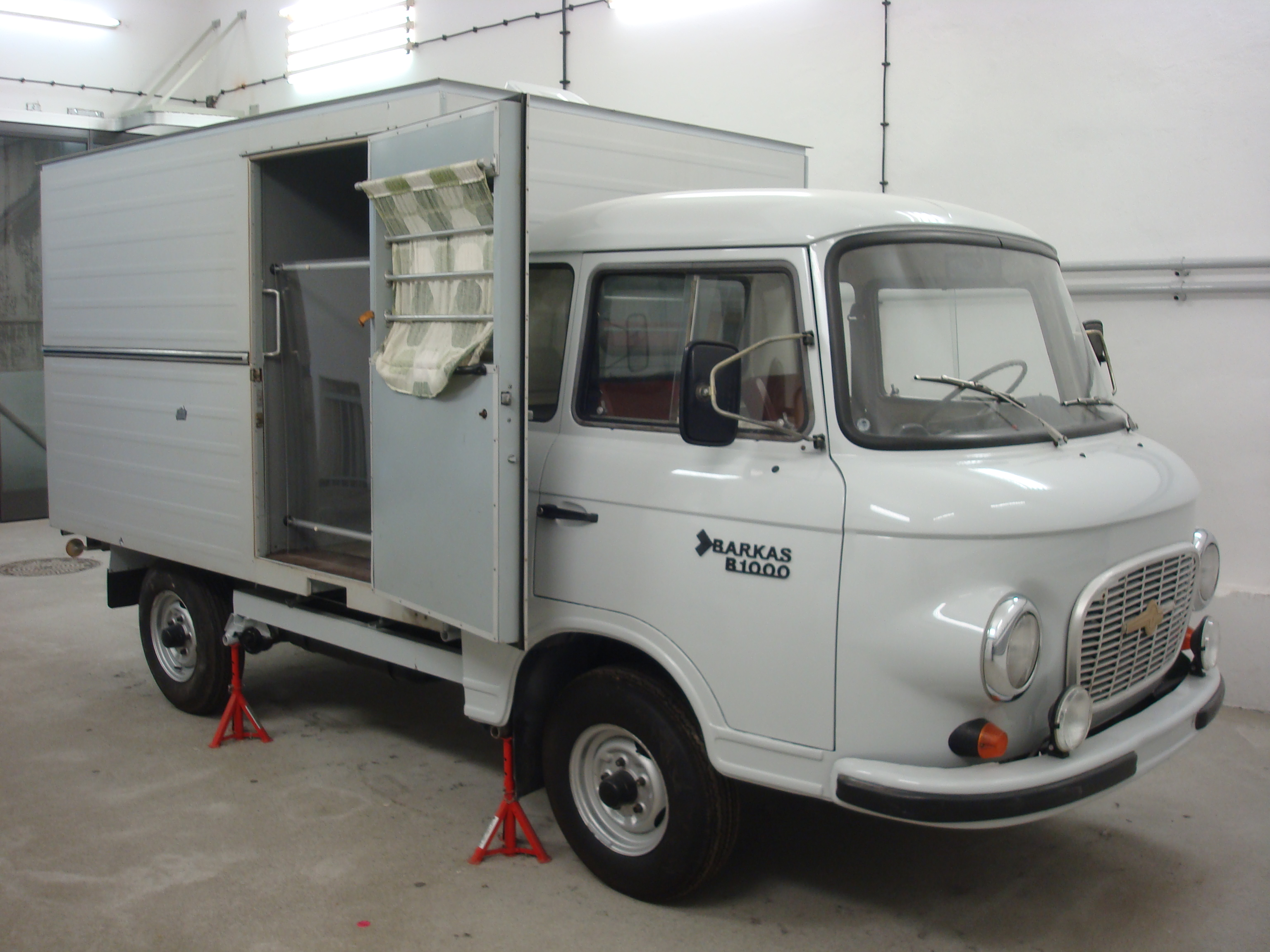
Stasi prisoner transport version

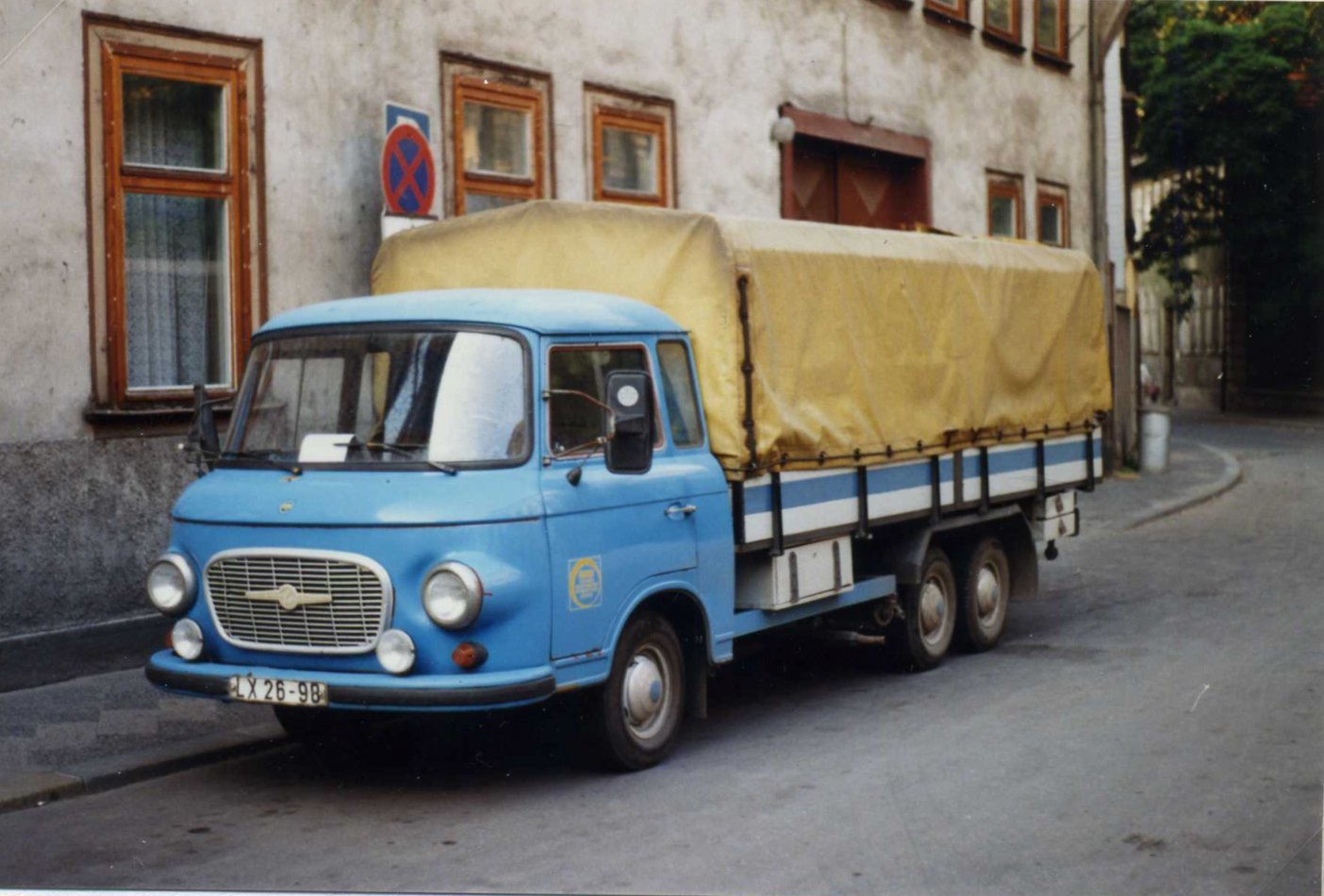
Tandem axle

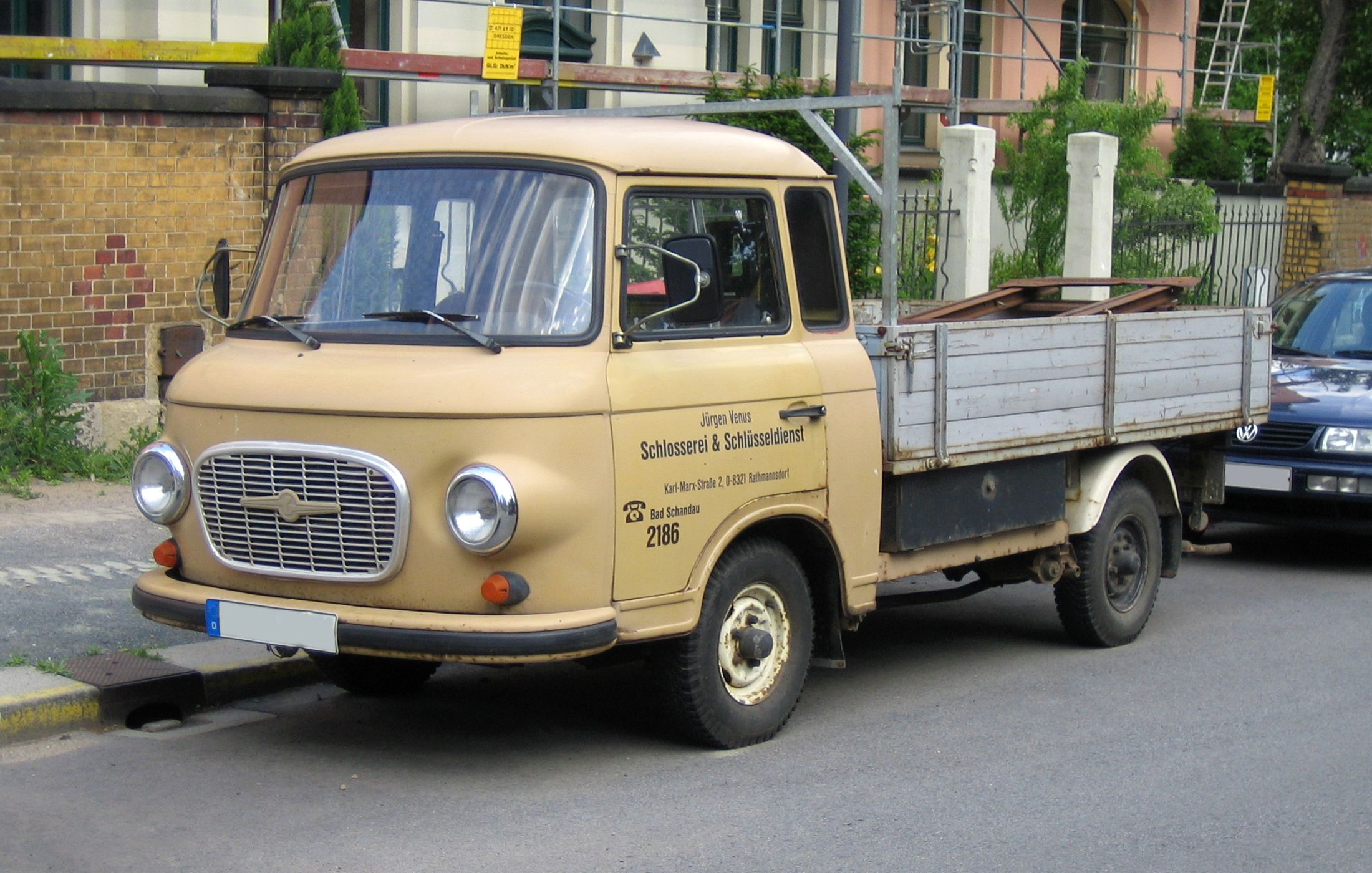
Pickup truck

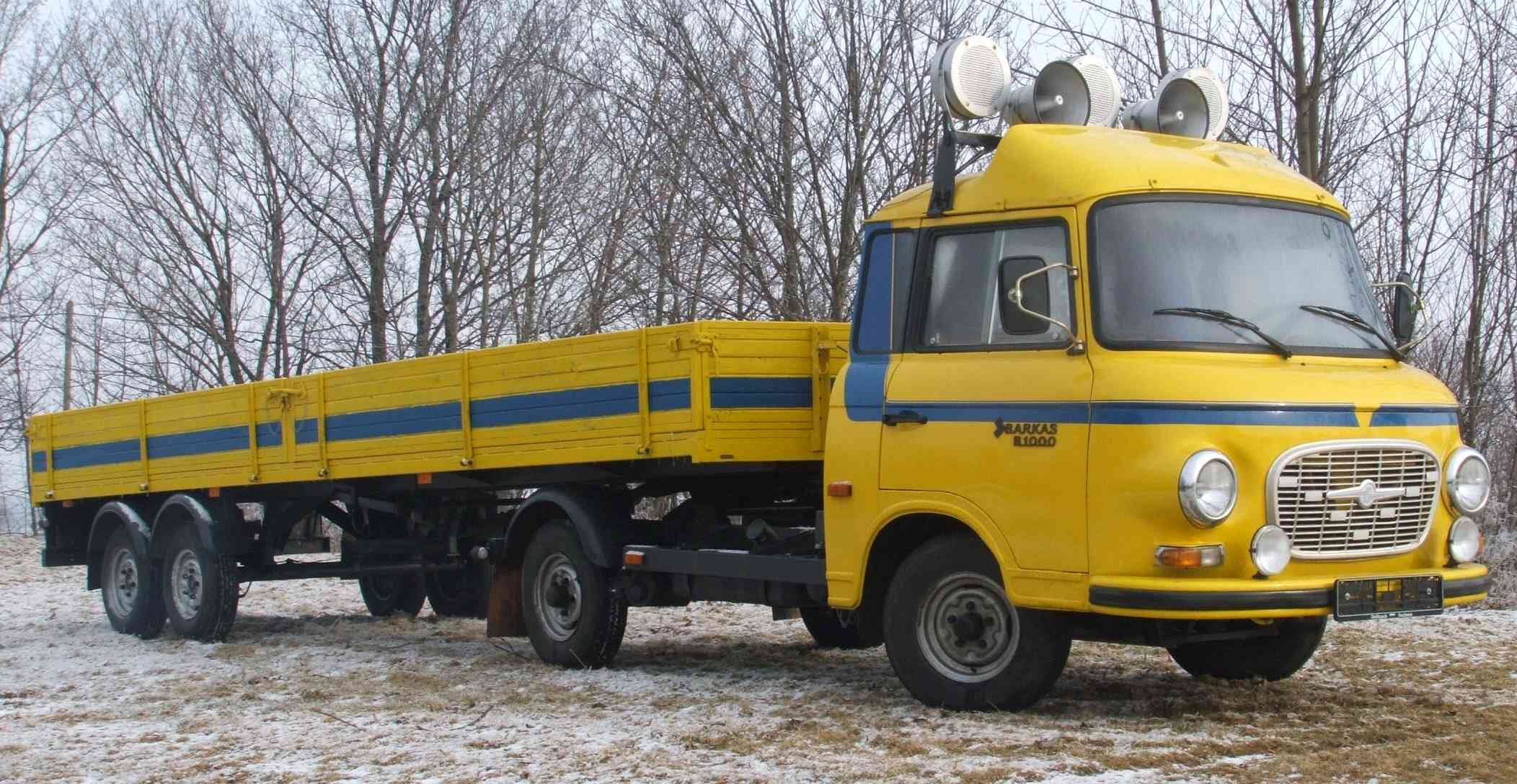
Semi-truck
