= Harry Barkas =

English footballer (1906–1974)

Personal information
- Full name: Henry Brown Barkas
- Date of birth: 21 January 1906
- Place of birth: Wardley Colliery, England
- Date of death: 1974 (aged 67–68)
- Position: Centre forward

Youth career
- Wardley Juniors

Senior career*
Years	Team	Apps	(Gls)
- Spennymoor United
1929–1930	South Shields	21	(15)
1930–1931	Gateshead	19	(7)
1931–1932	Liverpool	5	(0)
	Jarrow	?	(?)
- * Club domestic league appearances and goals

Henry Brown Barkas (21 January 1906 – 1974) was an English professional footballer who played centre forward for Spennymoor United before joining Football League Third Division North side South Shields in 1929, making 21 league appearances and scoring 15 goals. South Shields moved to Gateshead in 1930 and changed their name to Gateshead A.F.C., where Barkas played 19 league games, scoring 7 goals. In this period he also scored 5 goals in 3 FA Cup games. Barkas then moved to Football League First Division side Liverpool in 1931, making 5 league appearances. He later played non-league football with Jarrow.
