= Helga Steudel =

German motorcycle racer

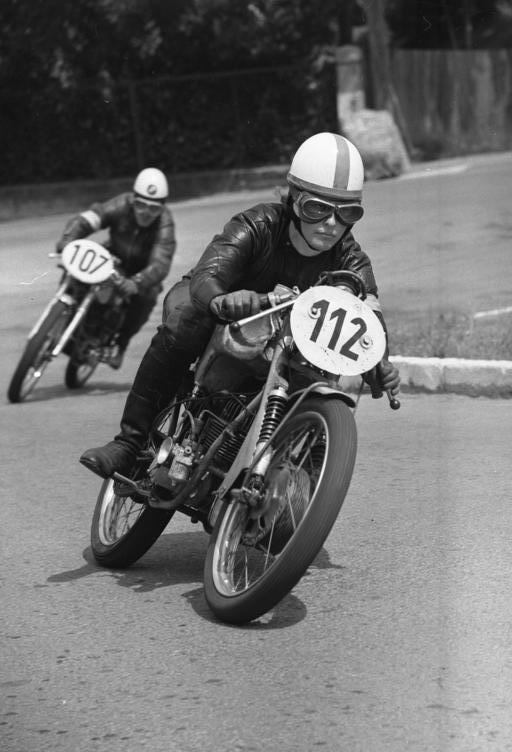
- Steudel competing at the Schleizer-Dreieck-Rennen in 1963.
- Nationality: German
- Born: 4 May 1939 (age 87); Görschnitz, Germany
- Website: Helga-Heinrich-Steudel.de (in German)

Helga Heinrich-Steudel (née Steudel, born 4 May 1939 in Görschnitz) is a former motorcyclist and car racer of the DDR. She is the only female motorcyclist to have won (under her maiden name Steudel) at the Sachsenring. She ended her career in 1967 but made a comeback in 1970 with her Melkus RS 1000 at the Lückendorfer Bergrennen.

== Early life ==
Helga Steudel was born on 4 May 1939 in Görschnitz, today a district of Elsterberg.

== Career ==
Helga Heinrich-Steudel competed in her first motorcycle race on the Bautzen autobahn circuit in 1959 riding a 350cc Jawa. From 1960 she competed on a MZ RE 125 in the 125cc class. She won her first races on 25 August 1963 at the Geyer-Bergrennen and on 29 September 1963 at the Dresden Autobahnspinne.

On 17 July 1965, Heinrich-Steudel won the 125-cm^{3} ID race at the Sachsenring, which was held as part of the GDR's Grand Prix for the Motorcycle World Championship, in very adverse weather conditions. She took further victories at the Schleizer Dreieck, Frohburger Dreieck and at the Lückendorfer Bergrennen on the MZ RE bike.

Under FIM rules of the time, Heinrich-Steudel did not receive a license to participate in the GDR championship or international motorcycle races, although she met the requirements every year from 1963. She ended her motorcycling career at the end of 1967.

On August 2, 1970, Heinrich-Steudel returned to racing, but in cars, racing at the Lückendorf Hill Climb; she finished fourth in a Melkus RS 1000. Her first victory in automobiles came on 7 September 1974, at the Glasbach Hill Climb in the Wartburg Spider (B6), also built by Melkus with a modified Wartburg engine. 1979 was her most successful year in automobile racing, with an overall victory in the GDR Best of Class B6 (Spider) and fifth place overall in the GDR Best of Class B8 Performance Class (LK) II racing cars.

At the end of 1983, Heinrich-Steudel officially retired from automobile racing, but less than a decade later, she climbed back into a racing car in 1992. Since 2004, she has participated in Classic events in the Formula Easter; and in September 2007, she once again raced on MZ RE 125 motorcycle.

In 2011, Heinrich-Steudel competed in as part of the GLPpro-Serie and the ADMV CLASSIC CUP, and in 2014 the then 75-year-old took part in several races.
