= Heinz Melkus =

East-German race car driver and constructor of sport cars

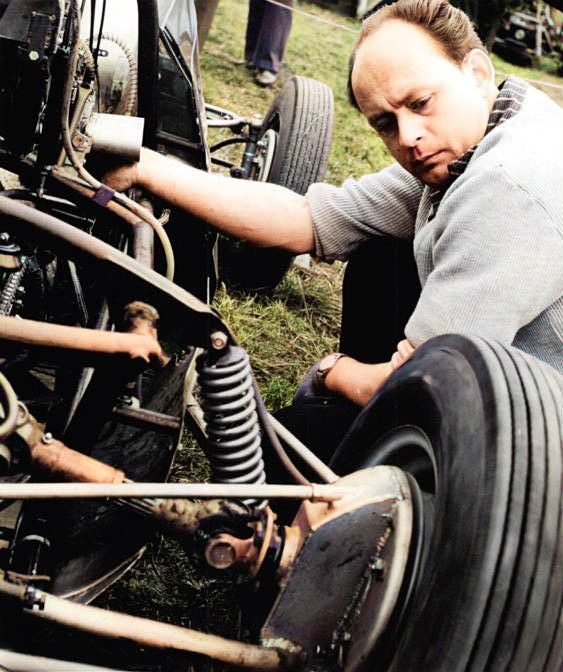
- Heinz Melkus working on his Melkus Wartburg in the pit at Halle-Saale in 1961
- Born: April 20, 1928; Dresden, Germany
- Died: September 5, 2005 (aged 77); Dresden, Germany

Heinz Melkus (20 April 1928 – 5 September 2005) was an East German race car driver and constructor of sport cars.

He founded the company Melkus to produce race and sport cars, his Wartburg based Melkus RS 1000 was with 101 build units the most successful one.

His sons, Ulli and Peter Melkus have resumed to build sports cars in 2006.

== Racing record ==
- 1958, 1967, 1968, 1972 Formula 3 East German Champion
- 1960 Formula Junior East German Champion
- 1963, 1965, 1966, 1967, 1972 Winner of the main event of the Friendship of Socialist Countries Cup

== Literature ==
- Horst Ihling: BMW (Ost), EMW, Wartburg. Autorennsport in der DDR. Delius Klasing, Bielefeld 2006, ISBN 978-3-7688-5788-8.
- Wolfgang Melenk: Heinz Melkus. Fahrlehrer, Konstrukteur und Rennfahrer. Festschrift zum 75. Geburtstag. Limbacher Druck GmbH, without ISBN.
- Wolfgang Melenk, Frank Rönicke: Meister des Sports. Der Automobilrennsport in der DDR. Motorbuch-Verlag, Stuttgart 2004, ISBN 3-613-02441-1.
- Wolfgang Melenk, Mike Jordan: Rennsportlegende Heinz Melkus. Lebenswerk und Sportkarriere des Dresdner Automobilkonstrukteurs und Autorennfahrers. Delius Klasing, Bielefeld 2008, ISBN 978-3-7688-5792-5.
