= East German Formula Three Championship =

Formula Three racing competition

- Category: Single seaters
- Country: East Germany
- Inaugural season: 1950
- Folded: 1972
- Drivers: 9
- Teams: 9
- Constructors: Melkus, SEG
- Engine suppliers: Fiat, Wartburg
- Last Drivers' champion: Hartmut Thaßler

The East German Formula Three Championship was the Formula Three racing competition in East Germany.

== History ==
The series was created in 1950. Until 1958 engines' maximum capacity could not exceed 500ccm. Between 1960 and 1963 the championships were held according to the rules of Formula Junior, then Formula Three. Since 1963 there were also Leistungsklasse II (LK II), which was the 2nd class of the series. In 1972, the series was replaced by East German Formula Easter Championship but that year there was organized the last LK II season.

== Champions ==
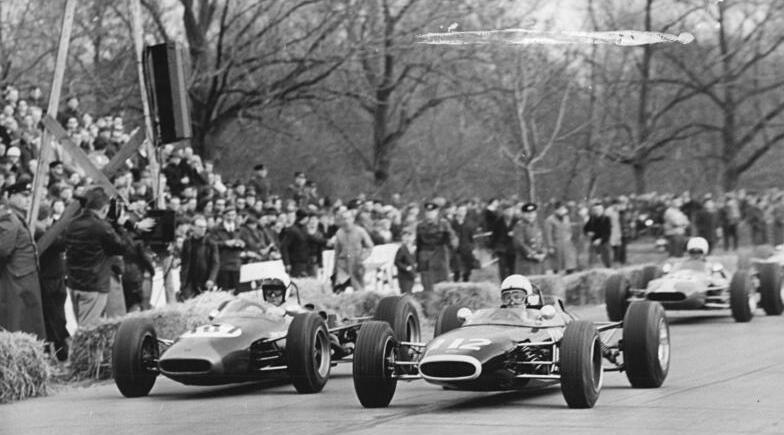
1967 Halle-Saale-Schleiferennen

Season	Champion	Team	Car	LK II champion
Formula Three
1950	(Germany) Richard Weiser	MSG Eisenach	Weiser Windsbraut-BMW	not held
1951	(Germany) Werner Lehmann	BSG Stern Luckenwalde	Zimmermann	not held
1952	(Germany) Willy Lehmann	BSG Einheit Bitterfeld	Grün WGW-BMW	not held
1953	(Germany) Willy Lehmann	BSG Einheit Bitterfeld	Grün WGW-BMW; Scampolo 502-BMW	not held
1954	(Germany) Willy Lehmann	BSG Einheit Bitterfeld	Scampolo 502-BMW	not held
1955	(Germany) Willy Lehmann	BSG Einheit Halle	Scampolo 502-BMW	not held
1956	(Germany) Willy Lehmann	BSG Einheit Halle	Scampolo 502-BMW	not held
1957	(Germany) Willy Lehmann	BSG Einheit Halle	Scampolo 502-BMW	not held
1958	(Germany) Heinz Melkus	MC Dresden	Melkus Post-JAP	not held
Formula Junior
1960	(East Germany) Heinz Melkus	MC Post Dresden	Melkus 60-Wartburg	not held
1961	(East Germany) Willy Lehmann	MC Halle	Scampolo 502-Wartburg	not held
1962	(East Germany) Willy Lehmann	MC Halle	SEG I-Wartburg	not held
1963	(East Germany) Hans-Theo Tegeler	MC Plauen	Melkus 63-Wartburg	(East Germany) Hans Roediger
Formula Three
1964	(East Germany) Max Byczkowski	MC Kraftverkehr Grimma	Melkus 64-Wartburg	(East Germany) Peter Bretschneider
1965	(East Germany) Willy Lehmann	MC Halle	SEG II-Wartburg	not held
1966	(East Germany) Willy Lehmann	MC Halle	SEG II-Wartburg	not held
1967	(East Germany) Heinz Melkus	MC Post Dresden	Melkus 64-Wartburg	(East Germany) Jürgen Käppler
1968	(East Germany) Heinz Melkus	MC Post Dresden	Melkus 64-Wartburg	(East Germany) Manfred Berger
1969	(East Germany) Frieder Rädlein	MC Lockwitzgrund	Melkus 64-Wartburg	(East Germany) Wolfgang Küther
1970	(East Germany) Klaus-Peter Krause	MC Gotha	Melkus 64-Wartburg	(East Germany) Siegfried Bubenik
1971	(East Germany) Wolfgang Küther	MC Betonwerke Dresden	Melkus 64-Wartburg	(East Germany) Lothar Wolf
1972	not held			(East Germany) Hartmut Thaßler
