= Melkus PT 73 Spyder =

- Production: 1973; 2 built (1 Destroyed)

Technical specifications
- Chassis: Melkus RS 1000 based on the Wartburg 353
- Axle track: 1,340 millimetres (53 in) (Front); 1,380 millimetres (54 in) (Rear)
- Wheelbase: 2,450 millimetres (96 in)
- Engine: Wartburg 1,118 cubic centimetres (68.2 cu in) (78 by 78 millimetres (3.1 in × 3.1 in)) Inline 3 RMR Layout
- Transmission: 5-speed manual
- Power: 110 brake horsepower (110 PS; 82 kW) @ 6,500; 145 newton-metres (107 lbf⋅ft)
- Weight: 700 kilograms (1,500 lb)

Competition history
- Notable drivers: Ulli Melkus; Frieder Rädlein
Entries	Races	Wins	Podiums
4	3	0	1

The Melkus PT 73 Spyder was a prototype racing car built by Melkus in 1973. It consisted of a new, open chassis for the Melkus RS 1000. The Škoda Metalex inspired the design. It used an 1118 cc, three-cylinder, triple carburetor two-stroke Wartburg engine.
