= Karl Gustav Ackermann =

German civil law notary and lawyer (1820-1901)

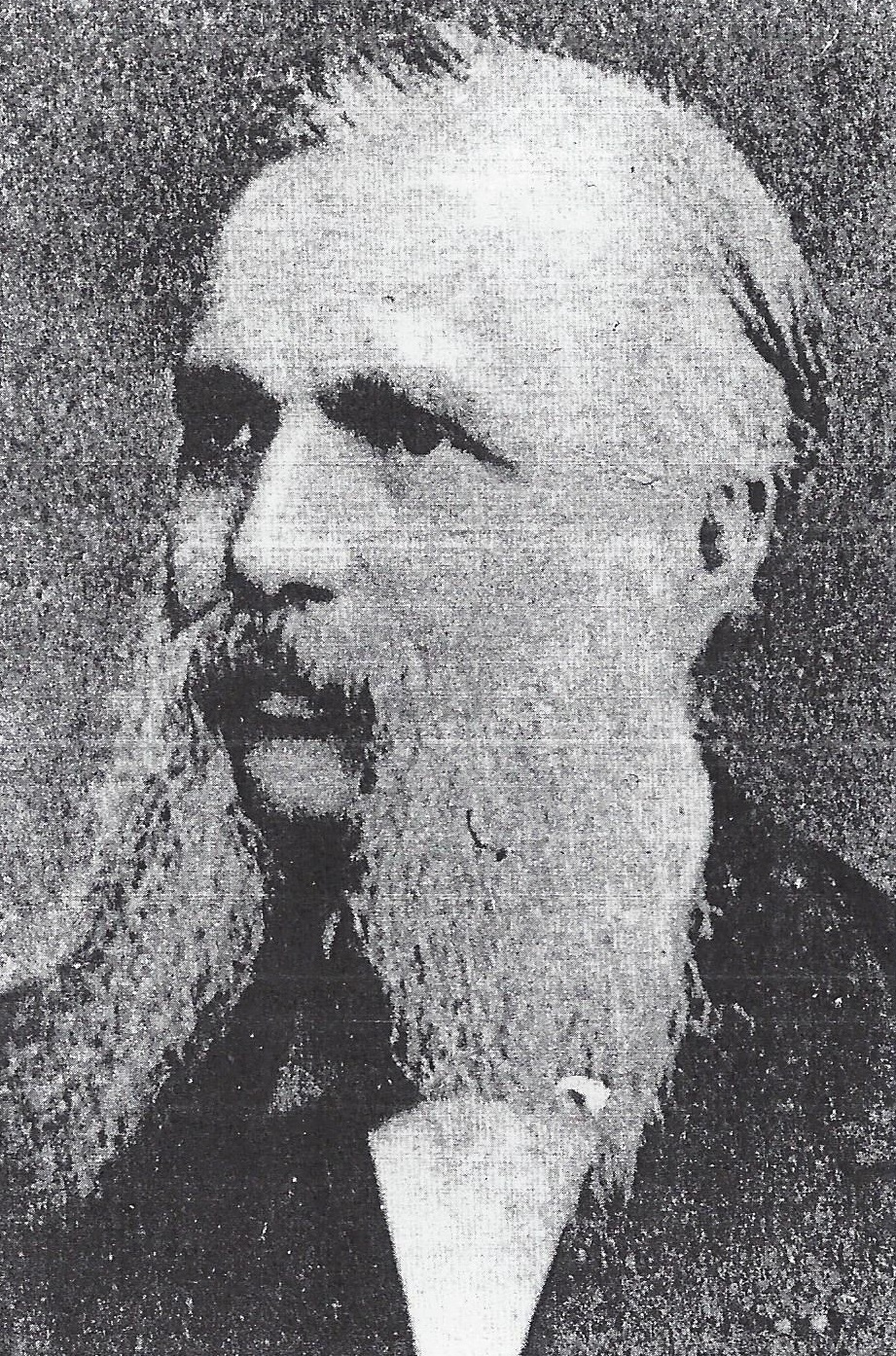
Karl Gustav Ackermann

Karl Gustav Ackermann (10 April 1820 in Elsterberg - 1 March 1901 in Dresden) was a Saxon and German conservative politician for German Conservative Party. He was a member of the Reichstag and the Saxon State Parliament.

== Biography ==
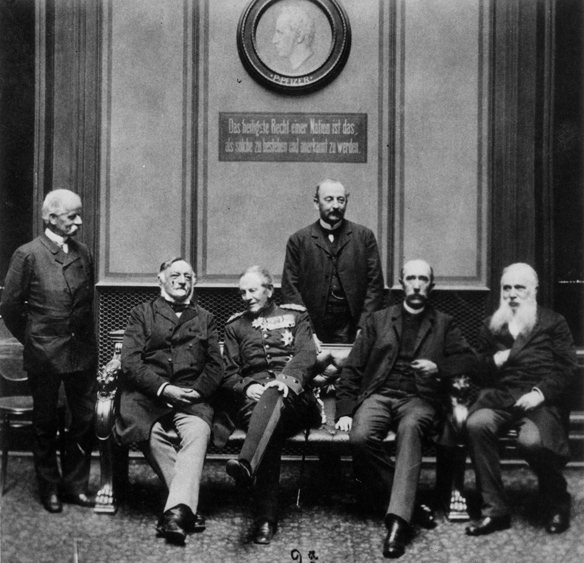
Members of the Reichstag parliamentary group of the German Conservative Party (from left to right): Rudolph Wichmann, Otto von Seydewitz, Helmuth von Moltke, Count Konrad von Kleist-Schmenzin, Otto von Helldorff, Karl Gustav Ackermann.

After graduating from high school in Grimma, Ackermann studied at the University of Leipzig from 1840 to 1843, and from 1843 to 1845 in Heidelberg. In 1840 he became a member of the Old Leipzig Burschenschaft. In 1841 he became active in the Corps Misnia Leipzig. He began his legal career in 1845 as a clerk in Königsbrück (Saxony), and from 1847 to 1849 as a council actuary at the Dresden city council. In 1849 he settled in Dresden as an independent lawyer and notary.

== Literature ==
- Elvira Döscher, Wolfgang Schröder : Saxon parliamentarians 1869–1918. The deputies of the Second Chamber of the Kingdom of Saxony in the mirror of historical photographs. A biographical handbook (= photo documents on the history of parliamentarism and political parties. Volume 5). Droste, Düsseldorf 2001, ISBN 3-7700-5236-6, pp. 339–340.
- Helge Dvorak: Biographical Lexicon of the German Burschenschaft. Volume I: Politicians. Volume 7: Supplement A – K. Winter, Heidelberg 2013, ISBN 978-3-8253-6050-4, pp. 1–2.
- Eckhard Hansen, Florian Tennstedt (Eds.) U. a .: Biographical lexicon on the history of German social policy from 1871 to 1945. Volume 1: Social politicians in the German Empire 1871 to 1918. Kassel University Press, Kassel 2010, ISBN 978-3-86219-038-6, p. 1 f. (Online, PDF; 2.2 MB).
- Josef Matzerath : Aspects of Saxon State Parliament History. Presidents and members of parliament from 1833 to 1952. Sächsischer Landtag, Dresden 2001, pp. 75f.
