= Melkus =

East German automobile manufacturer

- Native name: Melkus Sportwagen GmbH
- Type: Private
- Industry: Automotive
- Founded: 1959; 67 years ago in Dresden, East Germany
- Founder: Heinz Melkus
- Defunct: 2012
- Fate: original company defunct in 1986, revival founded 2006, defunct 2012
- Website: melkus-motorsport.de

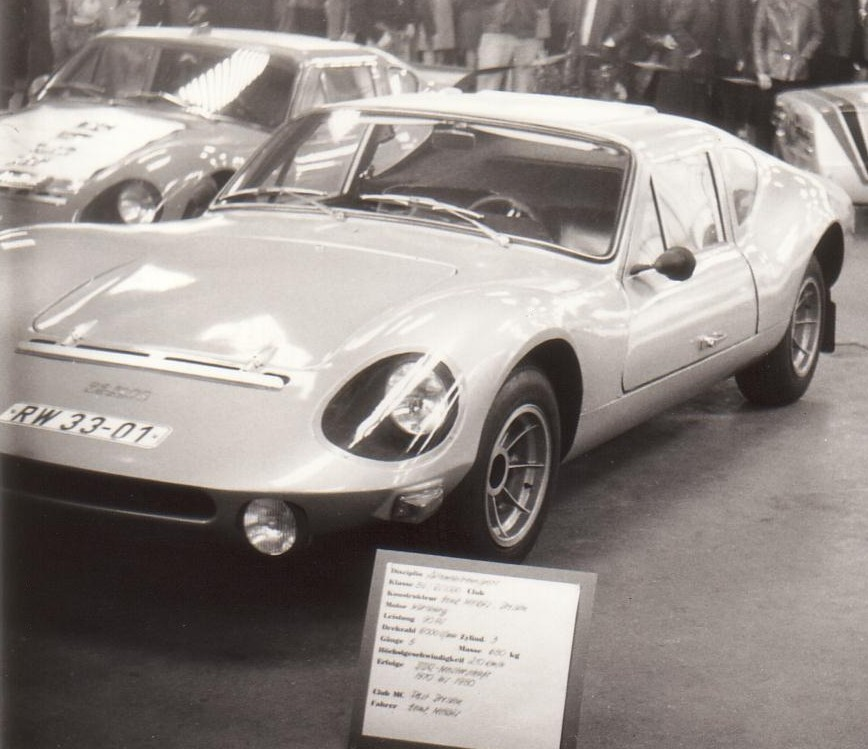
RS 1000 at Dresden Auto Show 1981.

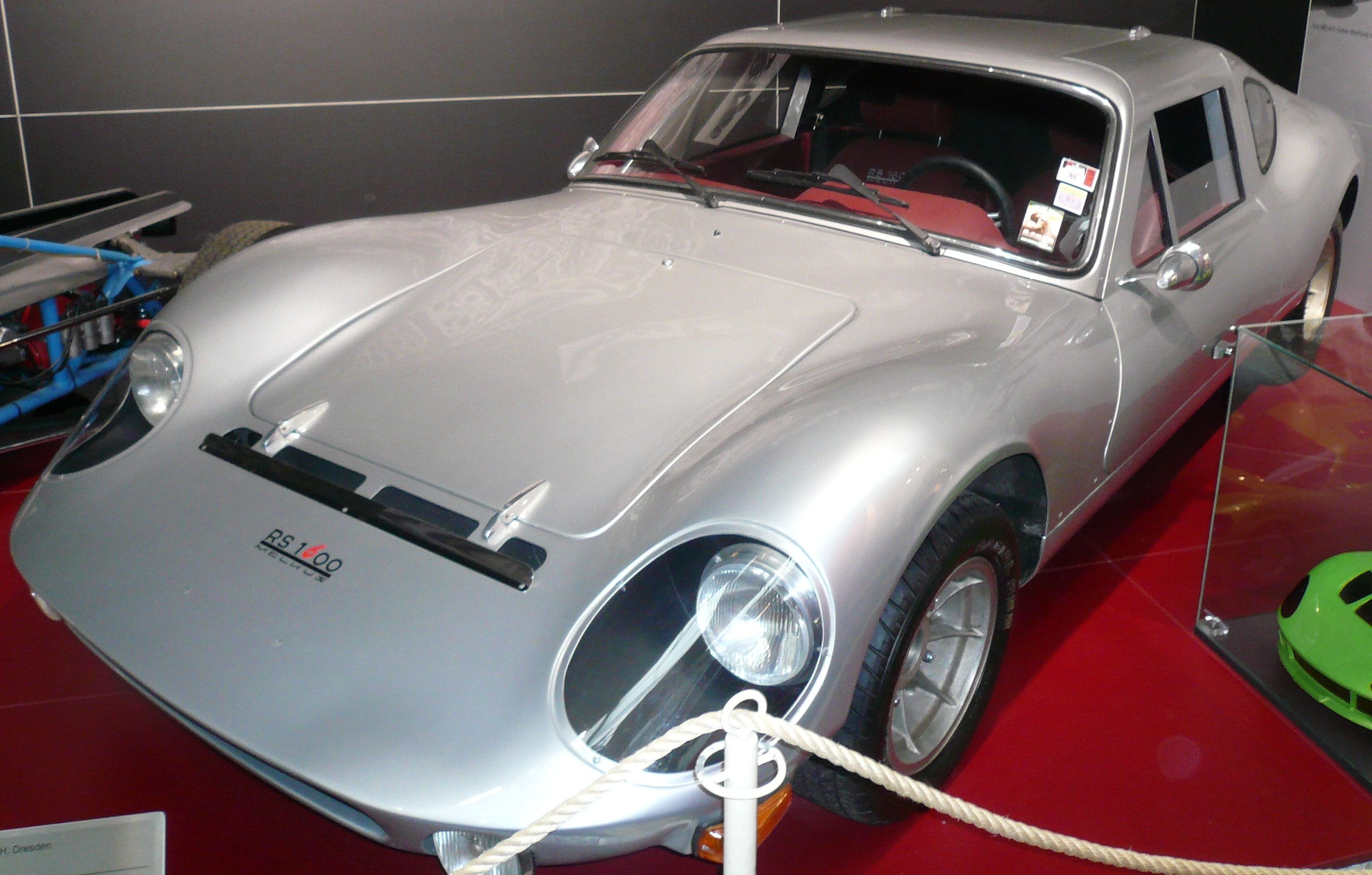
RS 1600.

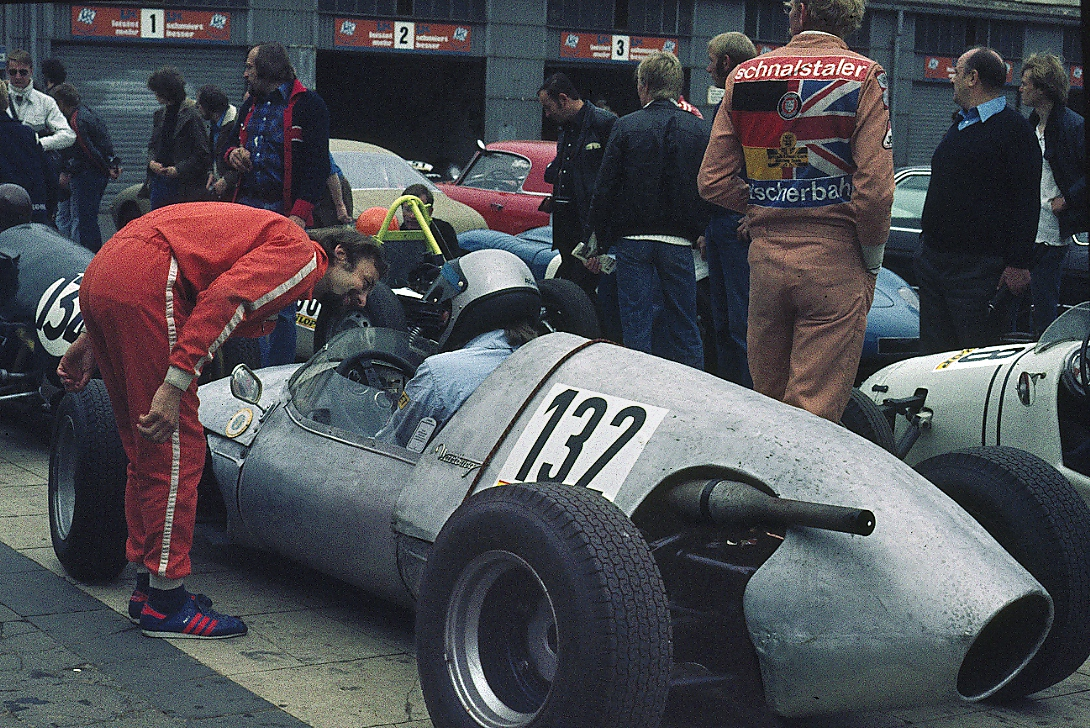
1959 Formula Junior car

Melkus (formerly Heinz Melkus KG and Melkus Sportwagen GmbH) was an East German marque of single seat racing cars and sport cars founded by the race driver Heinz Melkus in Dresden in East Germany.

== History ==
The company existed from 1959 to 1986, and then from 2009 to 2012. The cars originally used engines from Wartburgs and many of the other parts came from Wartburgs and Trabants. The racing cars competed in Formula 3, Formula Junior and Formula Ford. The 2009 to 2012 models used engines from Toyota and Volkswagen.

The only road car the company produced from 1959 to 1986 was the Melkus RS 1000. It was a sleek sports car powered by a tuned mid-mounted Wartburg 3-cylinder 2-stroke engine. Most of the cars used the 992 cc version, but some of the later cars had the 1200 cc version. It had gullwing doors. 101 cars were made.

The company stopped making cars in 1986. In the early 1990s, Heinz Melkus and his family started running a BMW dealership in Dresden.

In December 2006, Melkus Engineering--a German company owned by Peter Melkus, son of Heinz Melkus--announced it would re-launch the RS 1000 sports car. A new model, the Melkus RS 2000 was produced from 2009 to 2012. It was originally to be powered by either an Opel or turbocharged 150–200 hp (110–150 kW; 150–200 PS) Volkswagen engine. There was also talk about a GT model with 300 hp (220 kW; 300 PS).

The new RS 2000 premiered at the Frankfurt International Motor Show in 2009.

The car manufacturing arm of Melkus filed for bankruptcy in August 2012.

== Models ==
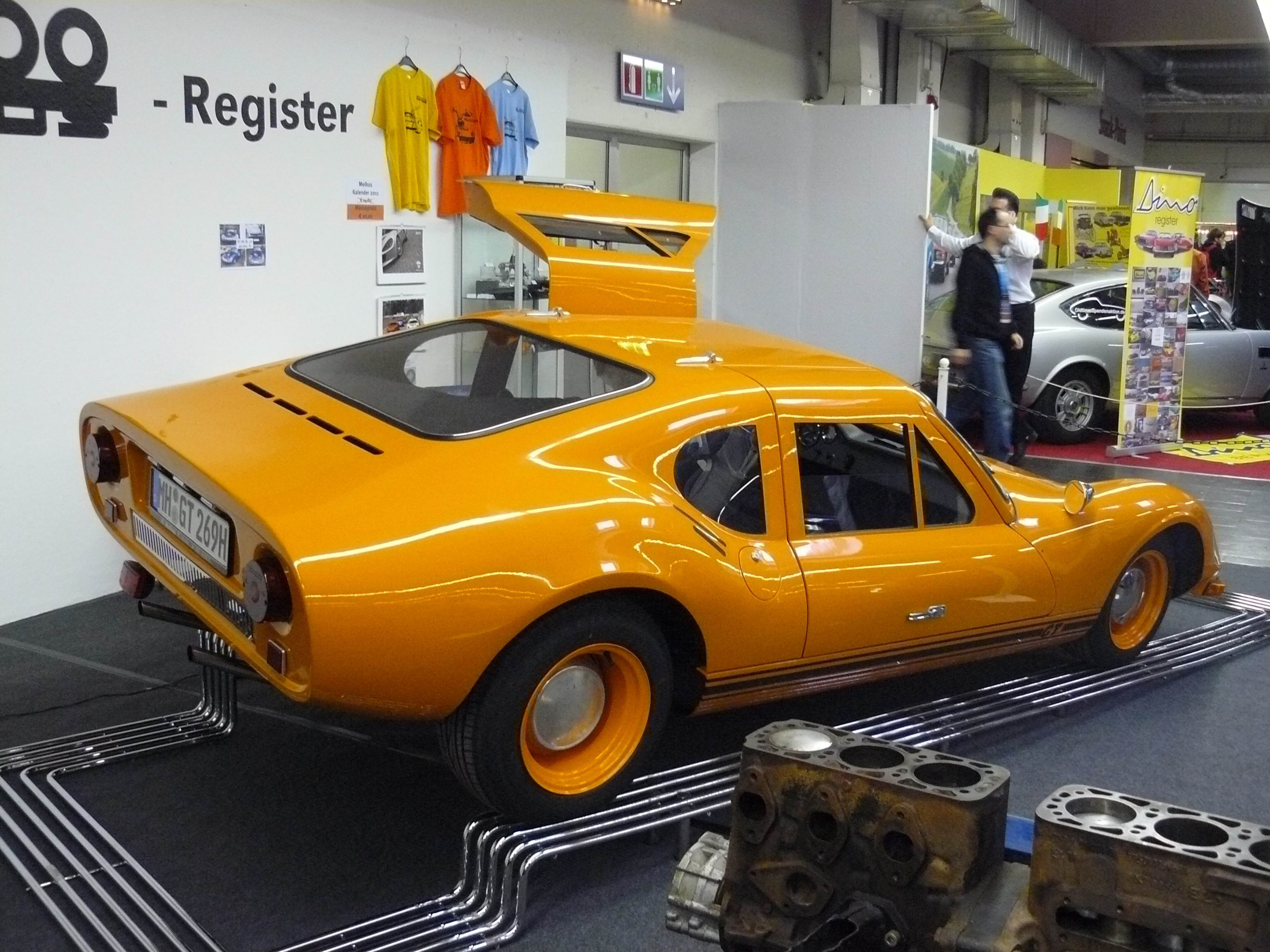
Melkus RS 1000 1969.

- Melkus JAP Eigenbau (1954)
- Melkus Formel Junior Baureihe (1959/60)
- Melkus Formel Junior Baureihe (1961/62)
- Melkus Formel Junior Baureihe (1963)
- Melkus Formel 3 Baureihe (1964)
- Melkus SRG MT 77
- Melkus PT 73 Spyder
- Melkus Lada ML89
- Melkus BMW MB90
- Melkus Silberpfeil
- Melkus Zigarre
- Melkus RS 1000
- Melkus RS 2000 (2008)
- Melkus RS 2000 GT (2011)
- Melkus RS 2000 GTS (2011)
