= Elsterberg =

- Town
- Coat of arms

- Location of Elsterberg within Vogtlandkreis district
- Interactive map of Elsterberg
- Location within Germany Location within Saxony
- Coordinates: 50°36′N 12°10′E
- Country: Germany
- State: Saxony
- District: Vogtlandkreis
- Subdivisions: 8

Government
  - Mayor (2022–29): Axel Markert

Area
  - Total: 25.1 km^{2} (9.7 sq mi)
- Elevation: 290 m (950 ft)

Population (2025-12-31)
  - Total: 3,570
  - Density: 142/km^{2} (368/sq mi)
- Time zone: UTC+01:00 (CET)
  - Summer (DST): UTC+02:00 (CEST)
- Postal codes: 07985
- Dialling codes: 036621
- Vehicle registration: V, AE, OVL, PL, RC
- Website: www.elsterberg.de

Elsterberg (German pronunciation: [ˈɛlstɐˌbɛʁk]) is a town in the Vogtlandkreis district, in Saxony, Germany. It is situated on the river White Elster, 6 km southwest of Greiz, and 13 km north of Plauen.

== Geography ==
=== Location ===
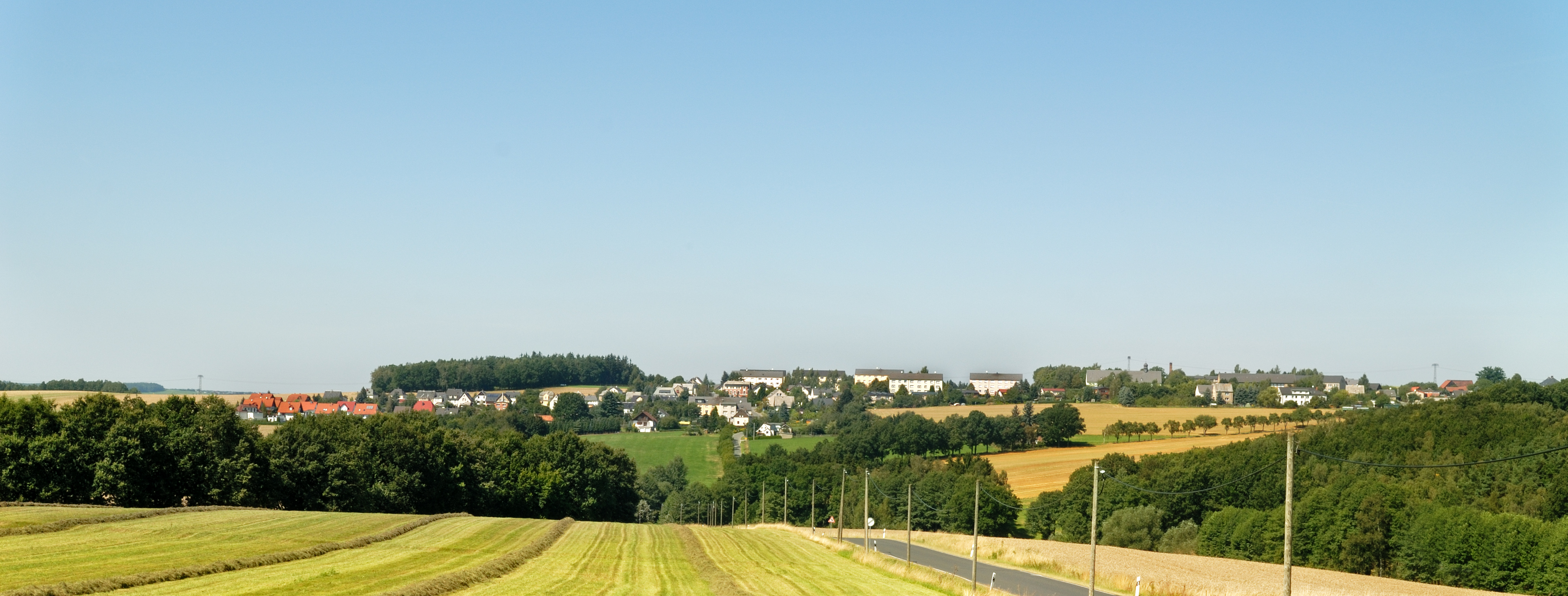
This image shows the district Coschütz of Elsterberg

Elsterberg is situated in a deep valley, which begins in the neighbouring town of Greiz, and is surrounded by dense forests. This valley continues till the incorporated village Gippe to the following nature reserve Elstertal. Elsterberg is situated directly at the river White Elster and belongs to the political area of the free state of Saxony. The federal road B92 leads through the town and connects the city Plauen and the towns Elsterberg and Greiz.

=== Constituent communities ===
Incorporated villages are:

- Coschütz and Rückisch
- Kleingera with Siedlung Reuth and Pfannenstiel
- Losa with Wipplas
- Scholas
- Cunsdorf
- Görschnitz
- Noßwitz
- the close settlement Gippe

== History ==
=== The early years ===
Elsterberg was first mentioned in documents dating from 1198. This mention is based on townspeople information and a document presumably destroyed by a fire in 1840. In this document a small knight seat, there called the old house of Elsterberg, was described. These castle buildings were situated on the rocks of Weßnitz and belonged to the Knight Ritter Rayer von Elsterberg, who called his mansion Elsterburg.

Years later the sirs of the Lobdeburg colonized the area and built up a new castle in 1225, later called Castle Elsterberg. These lords had let establish a huge church beneath their castle and let Frankonians and Saxons take up residence around as their subjects.

=== The founding of the town at 1354 ===
Originally there was no thought of founding this city, however, when 36 close villages came to Elsterberg in the purpose of starting their trade there, market rights were needed. The first appearance in documents of the name Elsterberg as a town was in 1354. Till the end of the 17th century Elsterberg was a typical rural town, fulfilling just its own requirements through trade inside its allowed zone of trading.

=== City fires ===
Three disastrous fires destroyed Elsterberg. In 1492 most parts of the town center went up in flames. In 1702 again the whole city center, except the parish and the manor Frankenhof, fell victim to the flames. After all a third fire destroyed the town, including its town hall and church, in 1840. All documentary files and records got irretrievably lost. Therefore, today's townscape is influenced by the restoration after 1840.

=== The upcoming industrialisation forms the spinnable-fiber-town ===
In 1882 the first mechanical weaving opened its doors in Elsterberg, becoming the Spinnfaser-Aktiengesellschaft Elsterberg in 1910, one of the most influential and important company in this field before WW II. The leather industry boomed as well. In the year 1885 Elsterberg was connected to the railway network between Gera and Plauen and that of course helped its industry and the raise of industrialization.

=== Second World War and Allied Occupation ===
The small town of Elsterberg remained exempt from air raids, except a few unexploded bombs, during World War II. On April 16, 1945 American troops occupied the town. In July of the same year Soviets took over the occupation. Being driven out of Bohemia-Moravia, the Sudetenland and Silesia, a great number of evacuees had found a new accommodation in Elsterberg since 1945. Supply bottlenecks made the situation here even worse.

=== Post-war years since 1945 ===
All factories in Elsterberg were expropriated, industrial plants and large estates were sometimes even violently confiscated, the machinery was dismantled and carried off to the Soviet Union and companies were forced to nationalization. Nevertheless, the production of spinnable fiber, leather and stoves could gear up slowly and under many difficulties.

=== The time from 1949 to 1989 ===
In 195 Elsterberg was integrated into the new district of Gera, Thuringia, within the administrative reform in Saxony. During the years in the former GDR, Elsterberg developed to one of the most important industrial locations of the district of Gera. At this time, industrialisation forms a modern industry town out of Elsterberg, with its "VEB"(state owned company) "Kunstseidenwerk", producing spinnable fiber and in the late 70s additionally sponges, its "VEB Wäscheunion", which as its first priority manufactured bed linen, its "VEB Wärmegerätewerk", which produced the coveted "Glutos"-stoves and its leather factory.

=== The period after the fall ===
Through the political change, the leather and stove industry collapsed and even the spinnable fiber industry had to suffer a lot. After 1990 just a few parts of the "Kunstseidenwerk" stayed alive. The "spinnable fiber of Elsterberg" remained internationally demanded, despite its reduced staff due to modernisation processes. This continued until 2009, when the "International Chemical Investment Group" closed the factory in favour of its affiliated factory in Obernburg, despite full order books. This was the end of the textile and chemical industry in Elsterberg. The adverse circumstances and a high unemployment nonwithstanding, Elsterberg developed a lot. The historic section of the town was renovated, the "Waldbad" (forest pool) was reconstructed, a bypass was built, historic structures of buildings were renewed with great attention to the detail, the "Bürgerkeller" (town hall) redesigned and all other parts of the city carefully considered.

mayors since 1877
1887–1903	Heinrich Haueisen
1903–1922	Emil Gebauer
1922–1945	Otto Lieske
1945–1947	Otto Geiler
1947–1950	Walter Ritter
1950–1954	Paul Rudorisch
1954–1955	Heinrich Fischer
1955–1960	Albert Biering
1960–1974	Anton Landgraf
1974–1975	Heinz Maier
1975–1986	Gerhard Braun
Oct./Nov. 1986	Werner Fischer
since 1. Dez. 1986	Volker Jenennchen

numbers of inhabitants (31. December) and incorporations:

- 1834: 2320
- 1840: 2081
- 1895: 4814 - incorporation 1868: Gippe
- 1910: 5196
- 1960: 5762
- 1965: 5673
- 1971: 5502 - incorporation 1972: Noßwitz
- 1982: 5156
- 1990: 4766
- 1994: 5735 - incorporations 1993: Görschnitz; 1994: Coschütz, Kleingera, Losa, Scholas and 1995: Cunsdorf
- 1999: 5442
- 2000: 5448
- 2001: 5350
- 2002: 5280
- 2003: 5217
- 2004: 5139
- 2005: 5053
- 2006: 4991
- 2007: 4907
- 2008: 4803
- 2009: 4797

== Personalities ==
=== Sons and daughters of the city ===
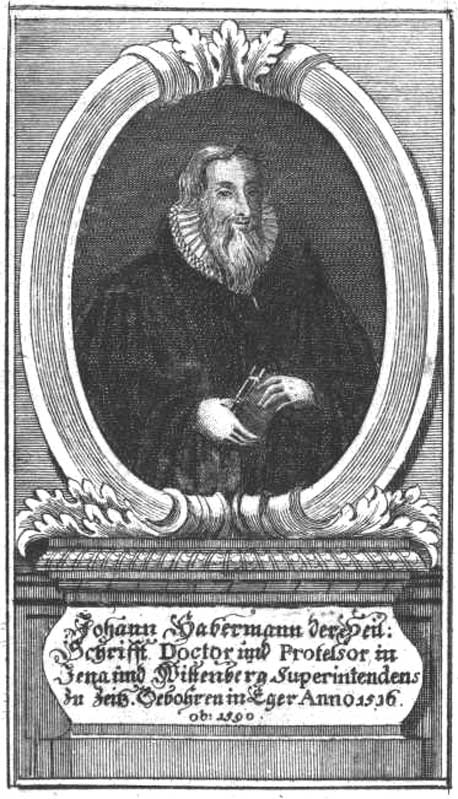
Johann Habermann

- Karl Gustav Ackermann (1820-1901), politician, member of German Reichstag
- Hans Heinze (1895-1983), psychiatrist, professor of psychiatry and neurology, involved in the children's euthanasia and Aktion T 4 in Nazi Germany
- Helga Heinrich-Steudel (born 1939), motorcycle and car racing driver, born in Görschnitz, lives in Mylau

=== Persons related to Elsterberg ===
- Johann Habermann (1516-1590), theologian, priest in Elsterberg

== See also ==
- Media related to Elsterberg at Wikimedia Commons
