= Melkus RS 1000 =

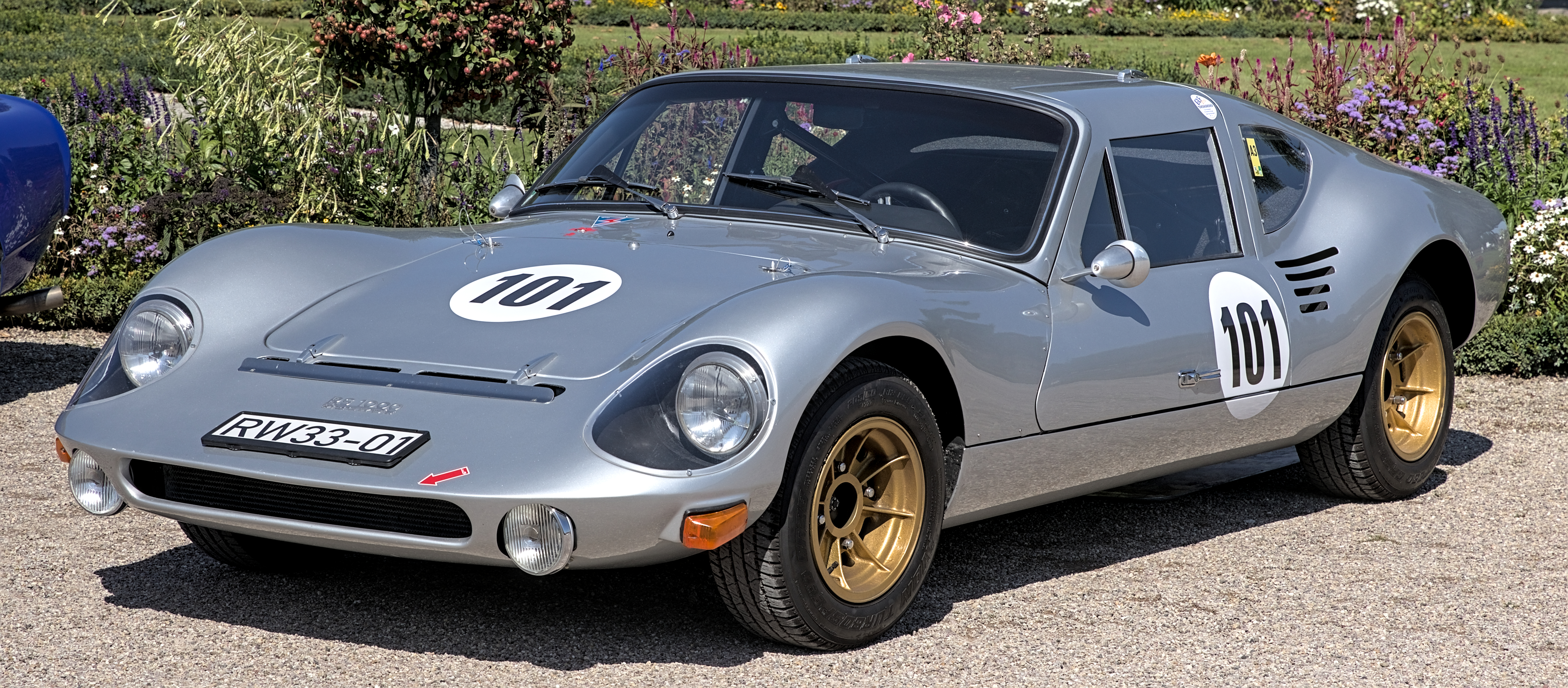

Overview
- Manufacturer: Melkus
- Production: 1969–1979; 101 produced
- Assembly: East Germany: Dresden
- Designer: Heinz Melkus

Body and chassis
- Class: Sports car
- Body style: 2-door coupé
- Layout: RMR layout
- Platform: Wartburg 353
- Doors: Gull-wing doors

Powertrain
- Engine: AWE353/1 I3 (992 cm^{3}, 51 kW)
- Transmission: 5-speed manual

Dimensions
- Wheelbase: 2450 mm (96.4 in)
- Length: 4000 mm (157.4 in)
- Width: 1700 mm (66.9 in)
- Height: 1070 mm (42.1 in)
- Kerb weight: 690 kg (1521 lbs)

The Melkus RS 1000 is a sports car produced by Melkus. It is powered by a tuned, mid-mounted 3-cylinder 2-stroke 992 cm^{3} engine, similar to the one in the Wartburg 353, and features gull-wing doors. A total of 101 cars were made between 1969 and 1979 in the Dresden factory.

To receive permission from the East German leadership to build the cars, Heinz Melkus with the Automobile Racing Commission of the ADMV (East German Motorsport Association) submitted an application to "build a sports car in the German Democratic Republic in honor of the 20th anniversary of the founding of the German Democratic Republic." The car was developed by a working group consisting of representatives of the ADMV, engineers from the Dresden University of Technology, the Dresden School of Transport, technicians from the Eisenach automobile factory and designers from the Berlin-Weißensee School of Art.

In 1972, the car was priced at 28,000 East German Mark, with a waiting list of 1.5 years. However, to purchase the car, one would have to provide "proof of racing activity" ("Nachweis einer rennsportartigen Tätigkeit"), which, however, the ADMV issued only in exceptional cases. Connections were also used to acquire the car, so that some vehicles reached the elite of the GDR population.

== Technical description ==
The RS 1000 has a traditional ladder frame and features a body-on-frame design. Being a racecar, it has a roll bar integrated into the windscreen frame and an additional roll bar installed behind the driver's seat. The RS 1000 has independent front and rear suspension, coil springs, stabilisers and drum brakes. The gearbox is a 5-speed manual; the clutch is the same as in the Barkas B 1000. A specially-tuned version of the water-cooled, two-stroke 992 cm^{3} AWE353/1 Wartburg engine is used. Unlike the standard, single-carb Wartburg engine, it has three carburettors, as well as a higher compression ratio. This engine produces 51 kW (68 hp) at 4500 min^{−1} and gives a maximum torque of 118 N·m (87 lb ft.) at 3500 min^{−1}. Fibreglass was used as the body material. The top speed is 165 km/h.

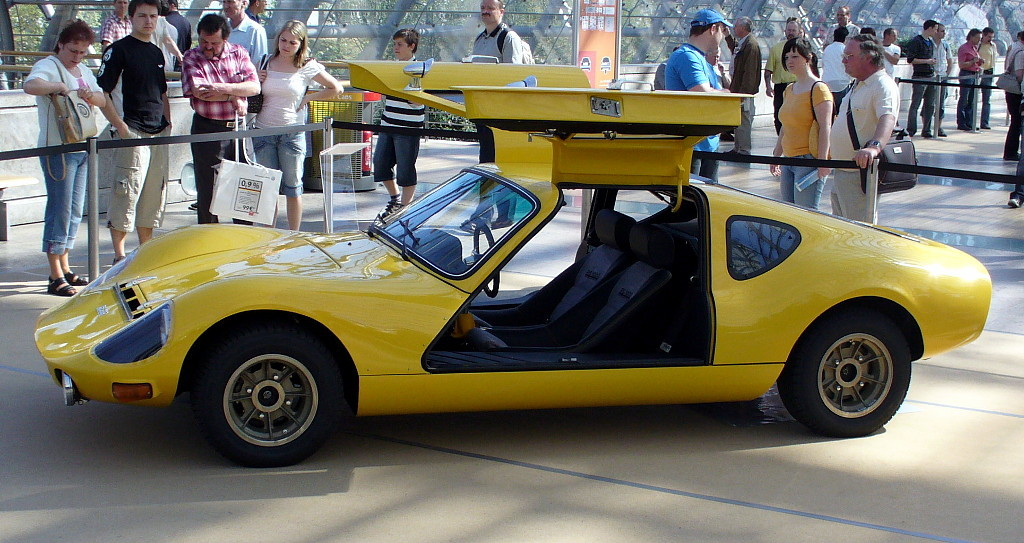
Gull-wing doors

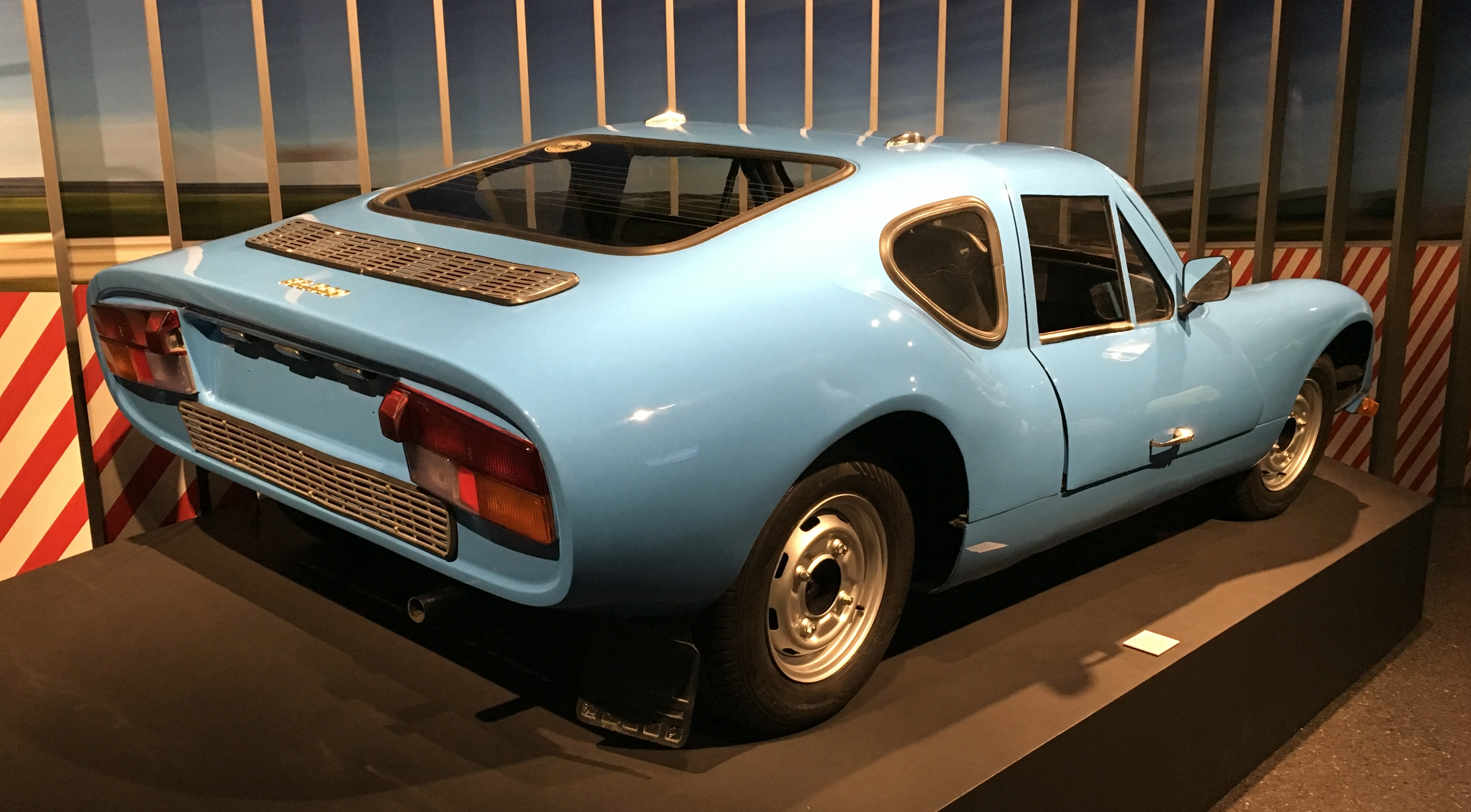
Rear view

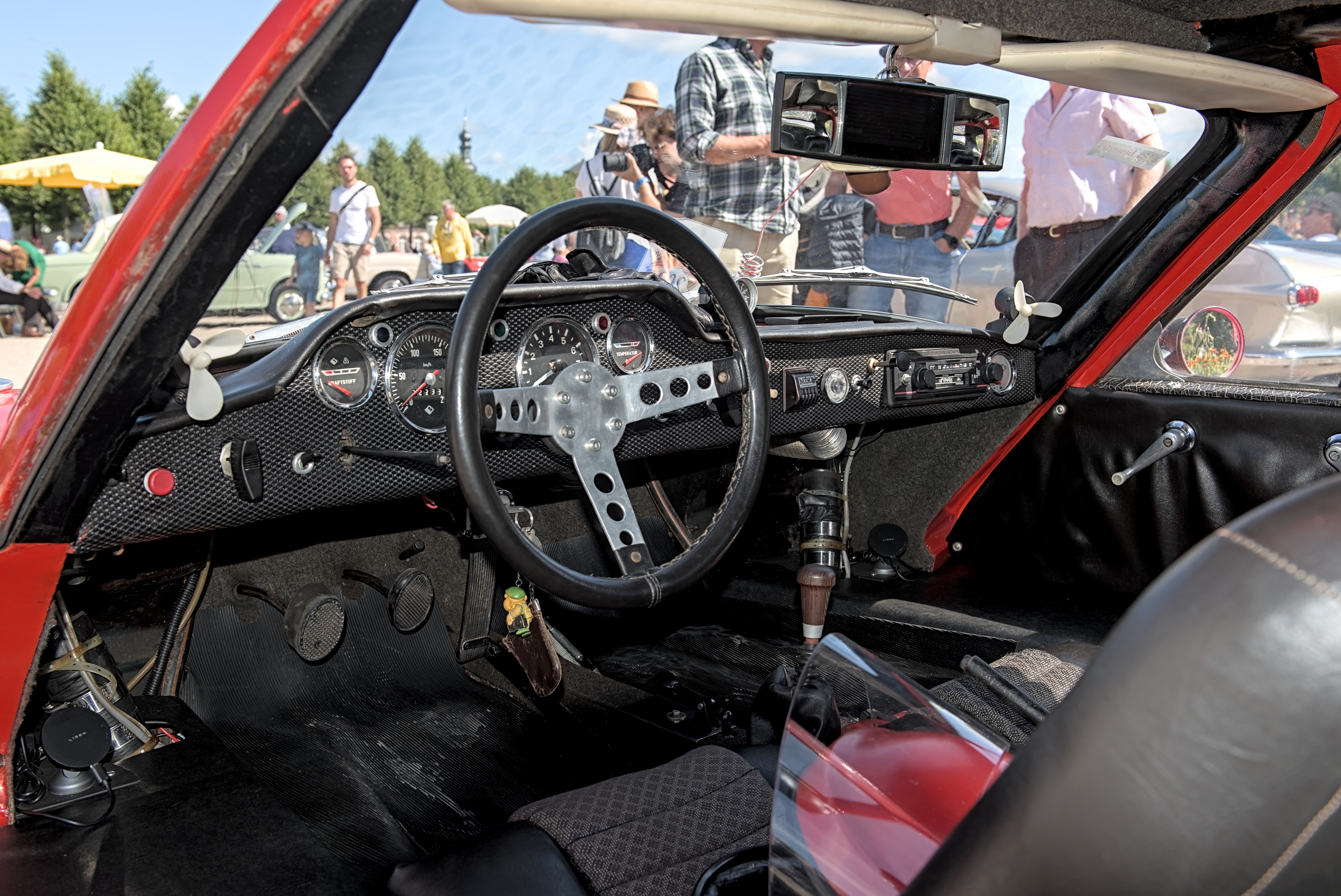
Interior

== After the Wende ==
The RS 1000 did not have an immediate successor. However, in time for the 50 year jubilee a limited series of 15 RS 1000 have been made. The first sports car of this series was presented on November 26, 2006. In 2009, the production of the indirect successor, the Melkus RS 2000 began. The production was halted in 2012 when Melkus registered as insolvent.

A yellow Melkus RS 1000, as well as a slot car version, are featured in the music video for ATC's 2000 hit, "Around the World (La La La La La)".
