= Wartburg (marque) =

1956–1991 automobile brand of VEB Automobilwerk Eisenach

Wartburg GmbH
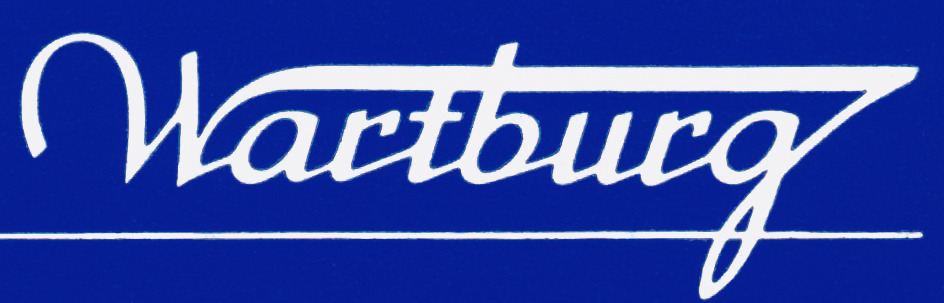

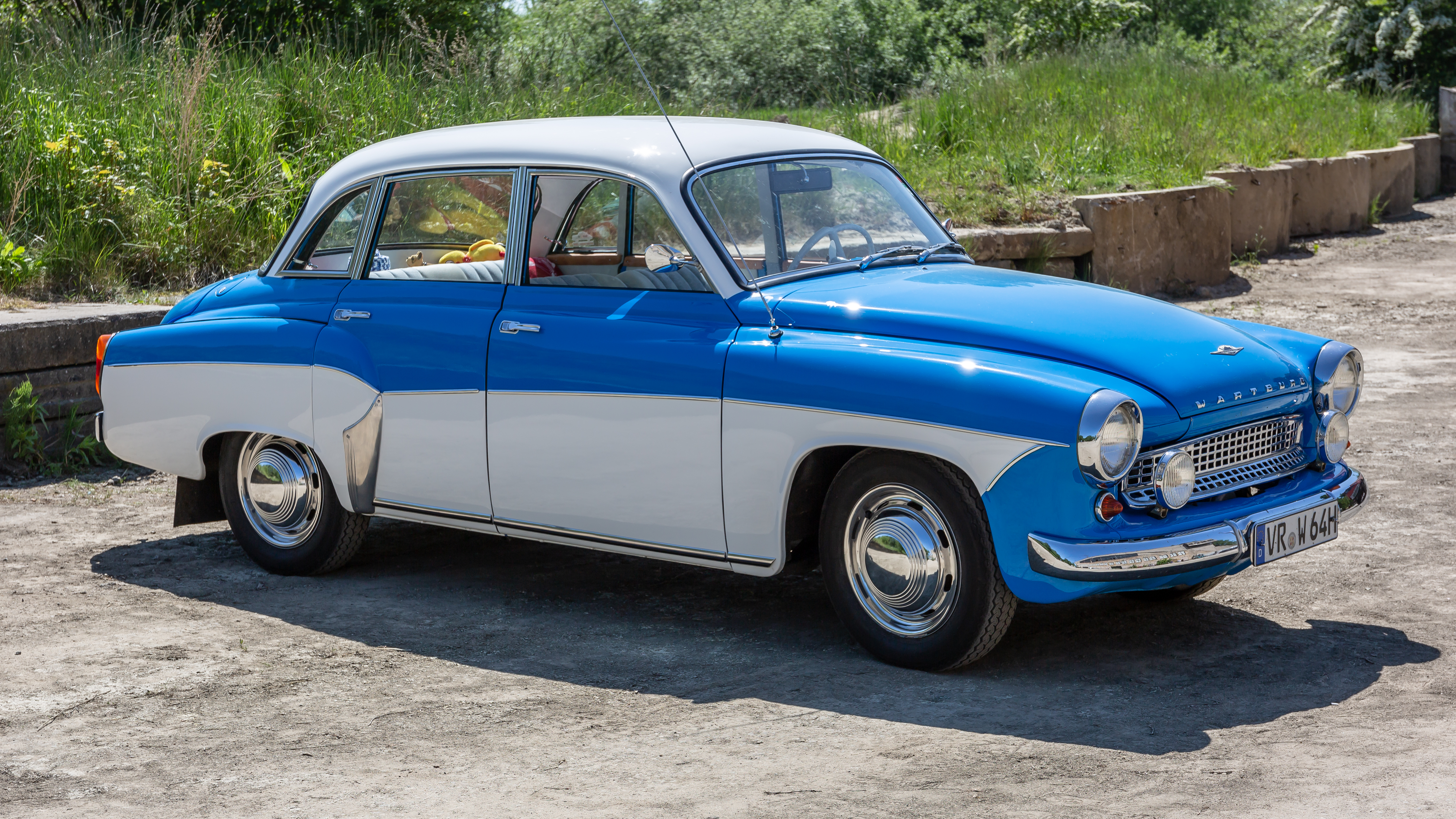
- Wartburg 311
- Type: Brand
- Industry: Automotive
- Founded: 1956
- Defunct: 10 April 1991
- Headquarters: Eisenach, East Germany
- Parent: VEB Automobilwerk Eisenach

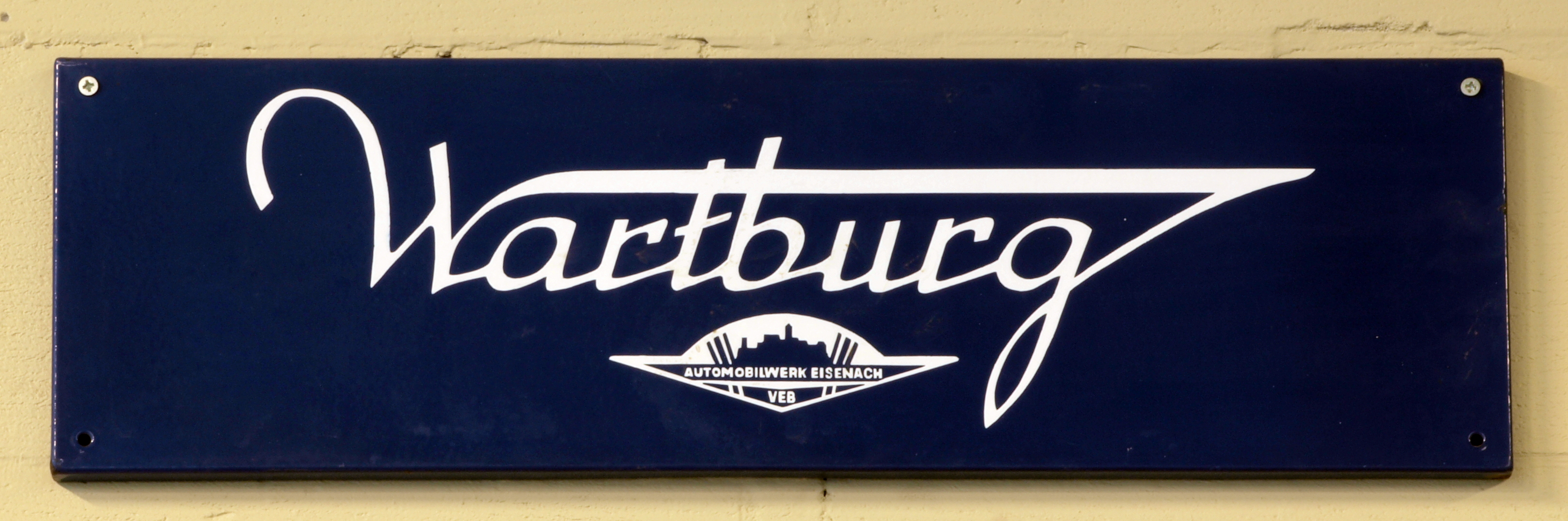
Wartburg sign

Wartburg was a marque of automobiles manufactured by VEB Automobilwerk Eisenach (AWE) in the German Democratic Republic (East Germany) from 1956 to 1991. It was the second best-selling car brand in East Germany after Trabant, with around 1.6 million vehicles produced in Eisenach.

Wartburg's origins date back to 1898, named for the Wartburg overlooking Eisenach, with AWE re-introducing the brand in 1956. Wartburgs were considered to be a middle class car, a step up from the common Trabant, reserved for those deemed more integral to the East German state. From the 1950s until the late 1980s, Wartburgs featured a three-cylinder two-stroke engine with only seven major moving parts: three pistons, three connecting rods and one crankshaft. The Wartburg 1.3 featured a four-stroke, four-cylinder engine licensed from Volkswagen from 1989 to 1991. Wartburg production ended when VEB Automobilwerk Eisenach was dissolved in April 1991 after German reunification, and the Eisenach factory was acquired by Opel.

== History ==
=== First usage of name ===
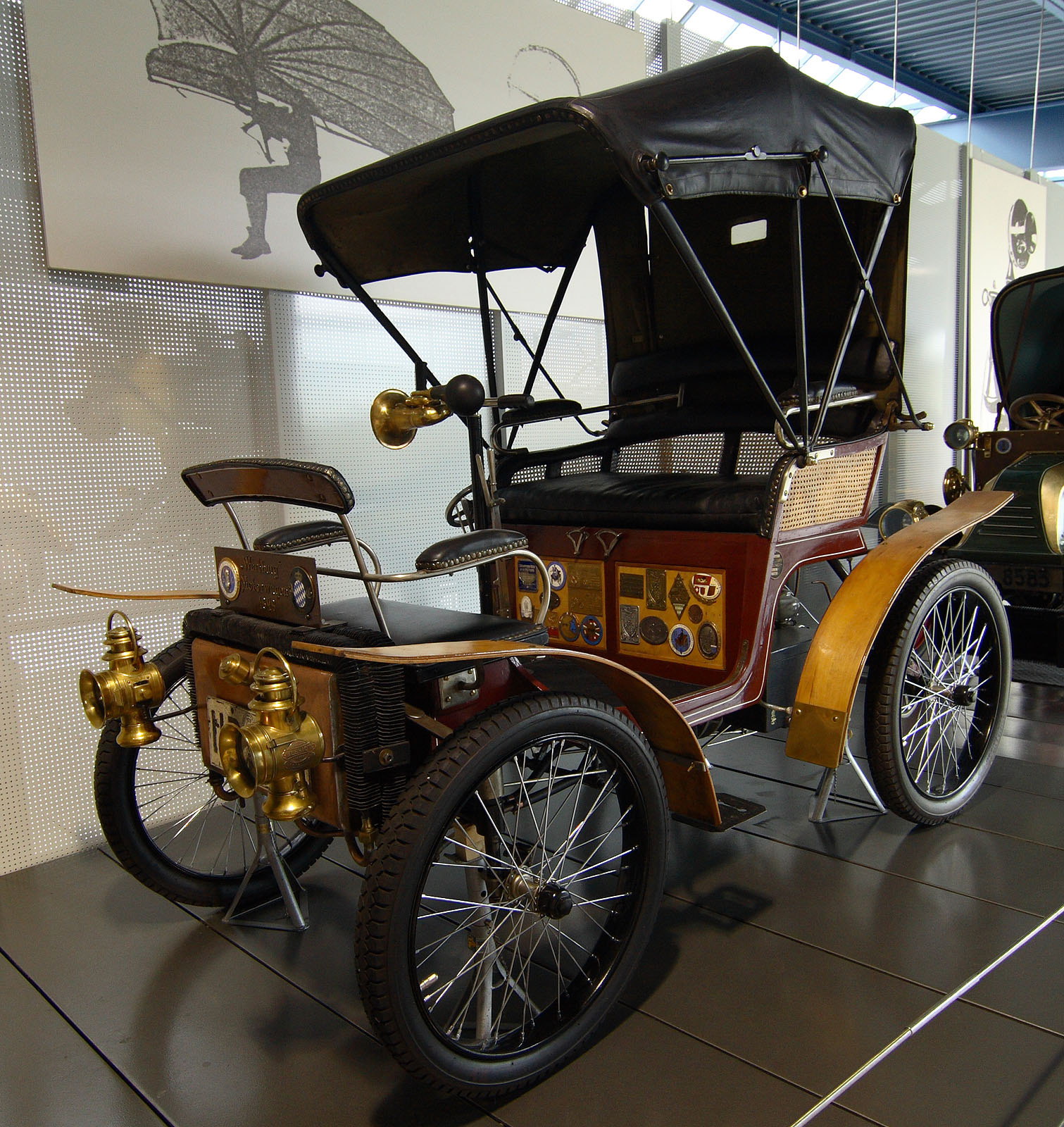
1898 Wartburg

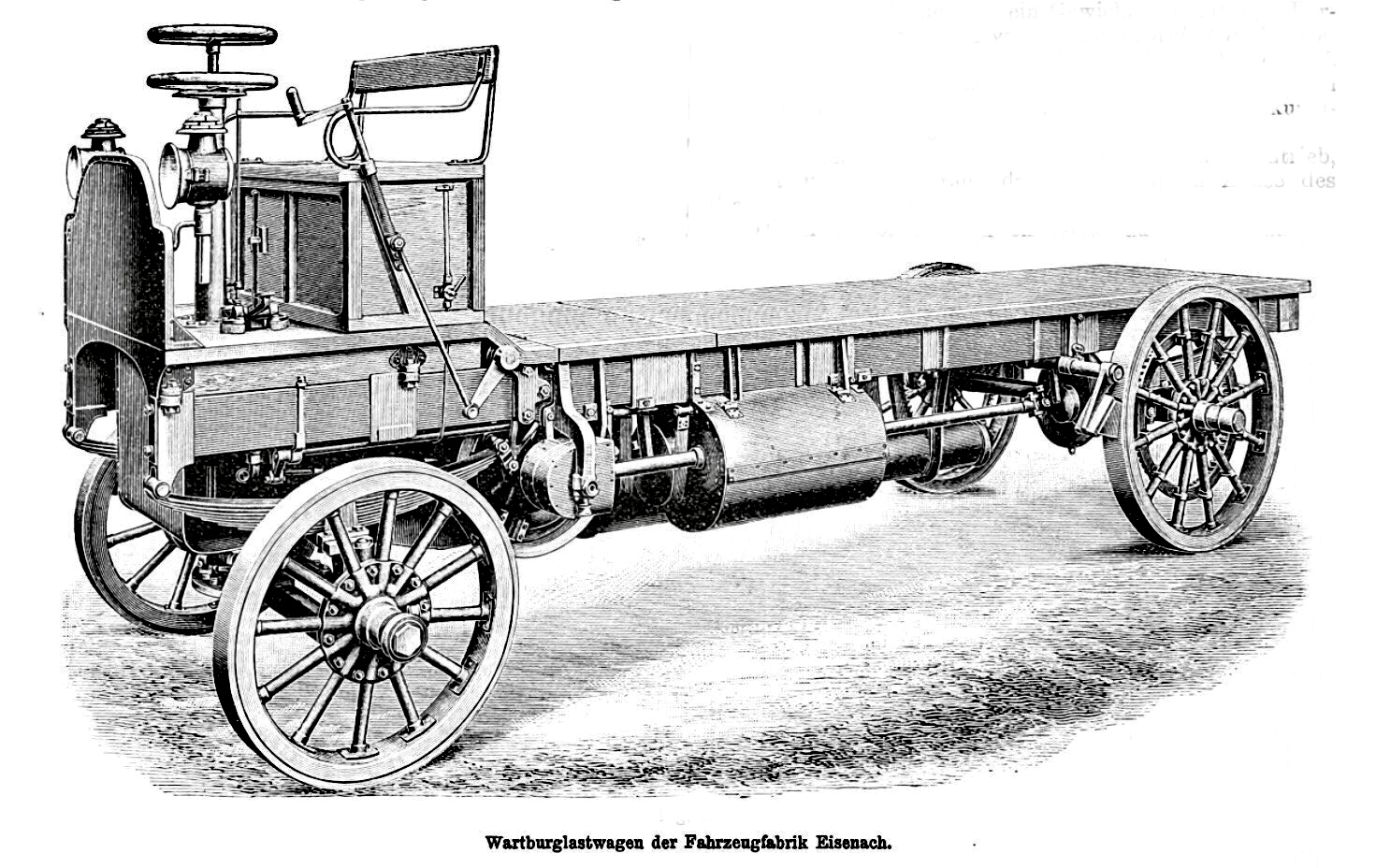
Wartburg 7500 kg 12 HP (1899).

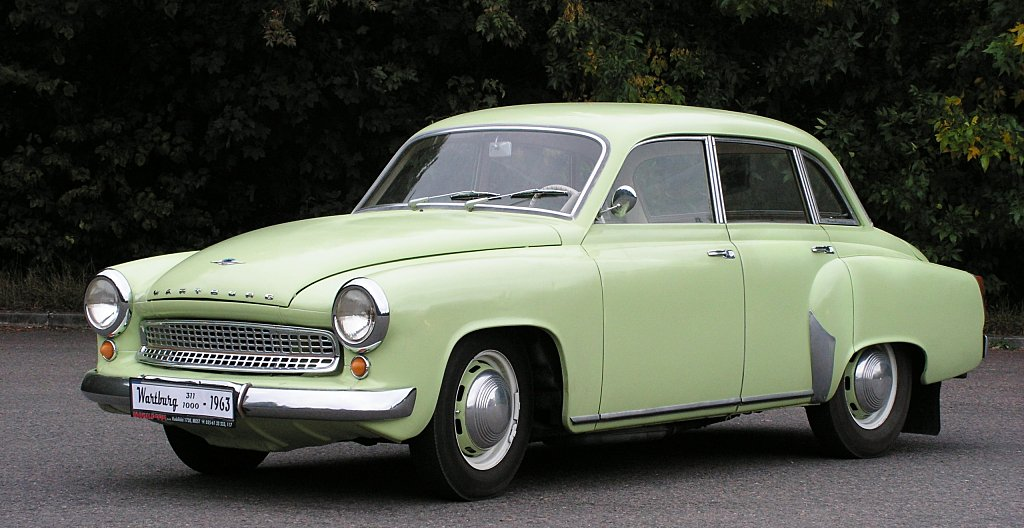
Wartburg 311

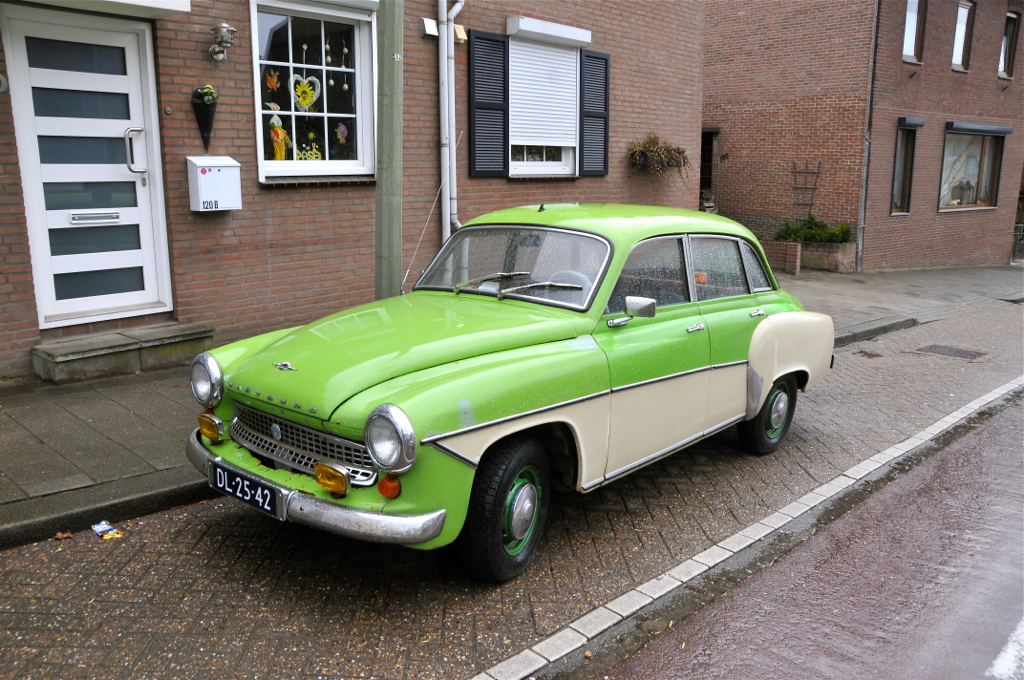
Wartburg 312

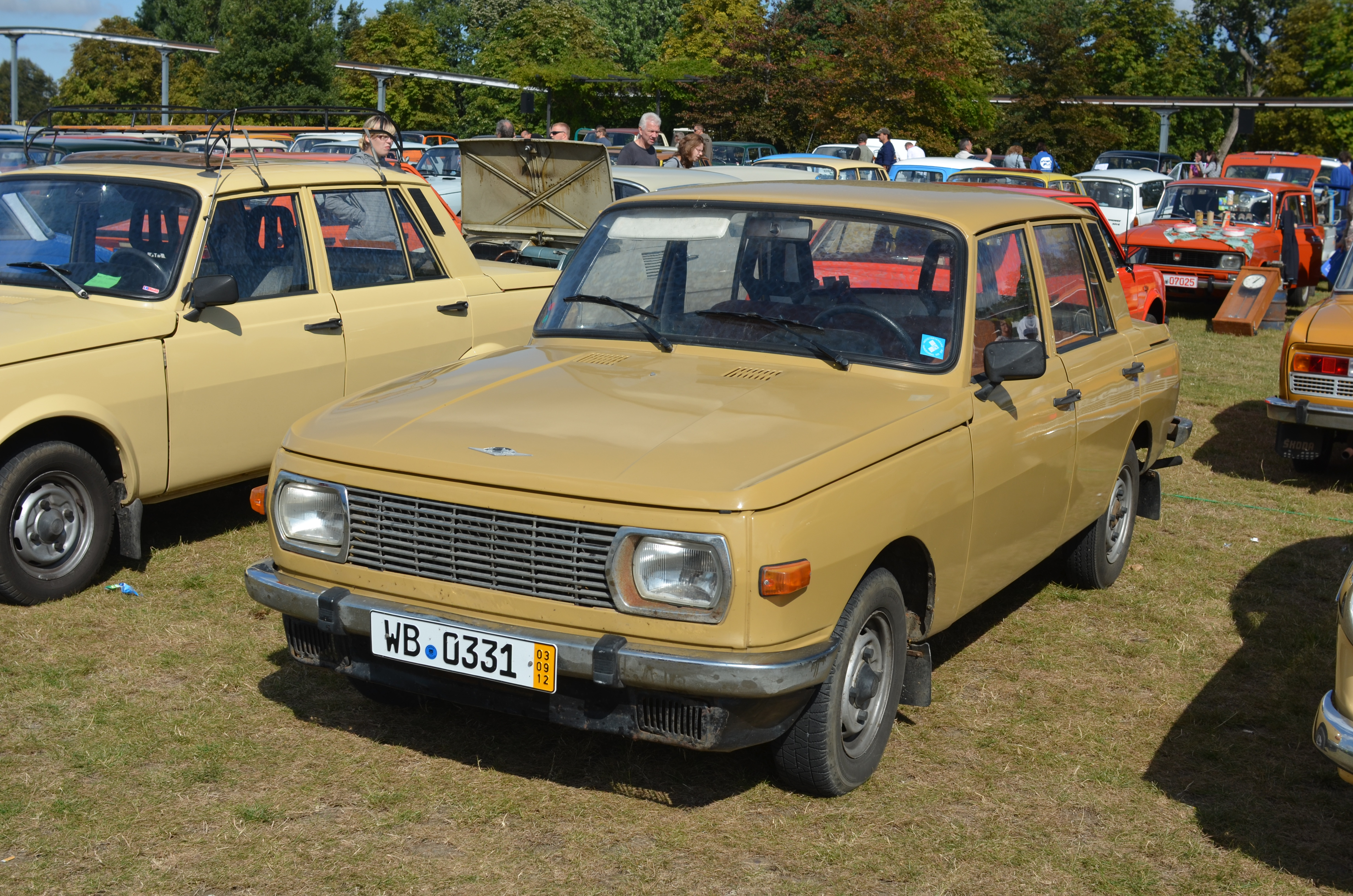
1988 Wartburg 353 (also known as the Wartburg Knight)

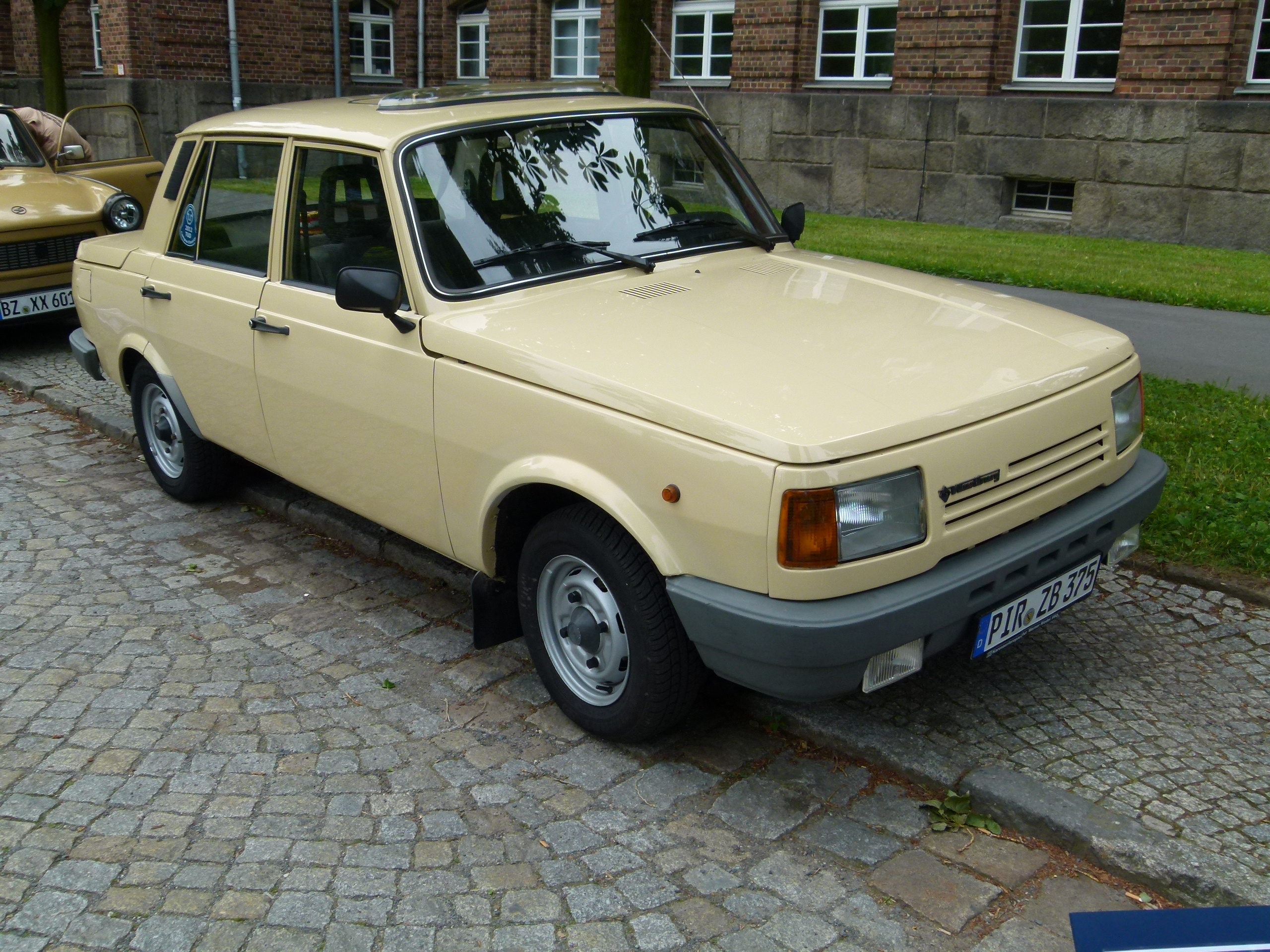
Wartburg 1.3; the last Wartburg model, in production between 1988 and 1991

The marque dates back to 1898 when a car made by Automobilwerk Eisenach was named the Wartburgwagen. It consisted of a cane chair to seat two people, four mudguards, two headlamps and a two-cylinder, 765-cc engine. Its top speed was 25 mph (40 km/h). The name was dropped in 1904 when the company changed hands but re-appeared briefly in the early 1930s on the BMW 3/15 DA-3 Wartburg, which was BMW's first sports car.

=== Main usage of name ===
The name was revived in 1956 by VEB Automobilwerk Eisenach and given to an updated version of its IFA F9 car which had been in production since 1950. The new car had a more powerful version of the three-cylinder two-stroke engine driving the front wheels and a completely new body. By this time, Germany had been divided into two countries (the West and the East) and the Wartburg factory was in the communist East (GDR).

Exports to West Germany began in 1958, and by the early 1960s the car was exported to other countries, including the United Kingdom and United States. Right hand drive models were first manufactured in 1963 and exported to Cyprus, with British buyers being introduced to the car in 1964. However, just 550 examples (450 saloons and 100 estates) were sold in the UK. These were two-tone models sold at the same price as a basic British Mini, appealing mostly to older people.

The 311 model was manufactured in a number of variations, including pickup, estate, and two-seater roadster. A convertible was advertised in the GDR in 1957 but its production never exceeded 350 units.

The engine was enlarged to 992 cc in 1962 and a completely new body was manufactured after 1966. This version, the 353, was sold as the Wartburg Knight in several countries, including the UK, where the estate model was sold as the Tourist. It remained on sale until 1976, by which time nearly 20,000 had been sold. This marked the end of right-hand drive Wartburgs, but left-hand drive versions continued to be imported to the UK and at least one model was converted to right-hand drive.

Also, in 1966, the gearbox gained synchromesh on all speeds and was designed to freewheel as a fuel efficiency and engine protection measure, which meant that unless the freewheel feature was disabled by a lever beneath the steering column, the car did not benefit from engine braking. Because the engine was a two stroke unit, it relied on the passage of the petrol mixture (two-stroke oil and petrol, at a ratio of 1:50) to lubricate the engine. With the freewheel device disengaged, the engine could be starved of lubricant and seize on long down-hill runs unless the throttle was opened briefly from time to time. Nevertheless, disengaging the freewheel device was recommended to give engine braking in snowy or icy conditions.

There are four main variants of the Wartburg 353:

- Wartburg 353 from 1966
- Wartburg 353W from 1975 ("W" for Weiterentwicklung, development)
- Wartburg 353W from 1983 (facelift)
- Wartburg 353S from 1985

There were also three bodystyles of the Wartburg 353: Limousine (sedan), Tourist (combi) and Trans (pickup). The 353W modification had a new, round-shaped dashboard and black-coloured grille. It was also fitted with disc brakes on the front axle. The 353S modification featured new rectangular headlights integrated into the grille of a new shape. In the De Luxe version, electronic ignition, 5-speed gearbox, front and rear fog lights, an alarm system and central lock door were available. Usually this model can reach around 150-155 km/h. Moreover, the radiator was moved from behind the engine (353, 353W) to the classic position behind the grille.

The engine of the car was with 50 or 55 or 57 PS (37 or 40 or 42 kW) (depending on the year of production and the carburettor type). Fuel economy was not impressive. The offer of Volkswagen to move a surplus engine assembly line to the GDR, to be paid off by manufacture, was accepted by the government on account of fuel economy. In 1988, the new model Wartburg 1.3 therefore replaced the old model 353S, featuring the reliable, though bulkier, four-stroke engine from the Volkswagen Golf. Being larger than the compact 2-stroke unit, this needed considerable reconstruction of the engine compartment.

=== Demise ===
The VW engine gave 64 horsepower. The new Wartburg was short-lived, its end being sealed by German reunification; production was inefficient and could not compete with West German manufacturers. Production ended on 10 April 1991, and the factory was acquired by Opel.

There are still some cars in a roadworthy condition, and Wartburg owners' clubs exist throughout Europe. Some Wartburgs are still used as rally cars.

=== Potential revival ===
In 2009, it was reported that Opel was considering reviving the Wartburg marque for a range of low-cost vehicles based on the Opel Corsa, as one of several options regarding the future of the Eisenach plant. The new Wartburg would reportedly be priced at around EUR7,000 and would serve a similar market to Renault's Dacia brand. The plan was not realised and Opel was later sold to the French PSA Group.

== Derivatives ==
The Melkus RS 1000 used a mid-mounted three-cylinder two-stroke engine from the Wartburg 353.

== Models ==
- 311, 1956–1965
- 313 (Roadster), 1957–1960
- 312, 1965–1967
- 353 (Knight), 1965–1989
- 1.3, 1988–1991

== Gallery ==
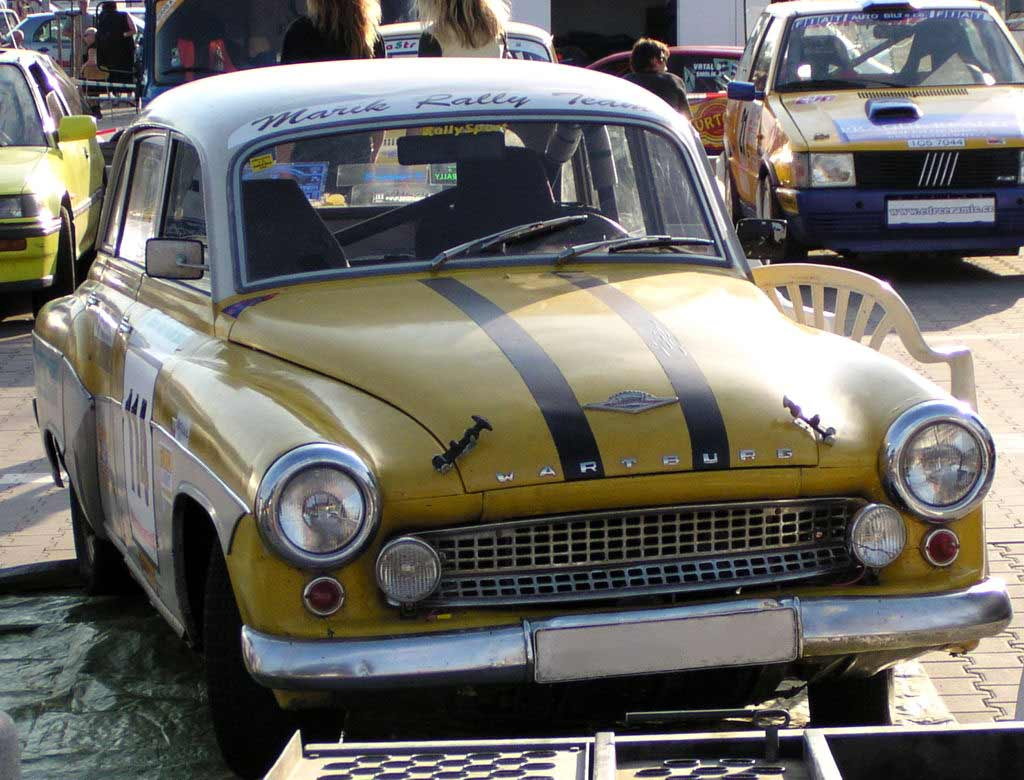
Wartburg 311: in production between 1956 and 1965

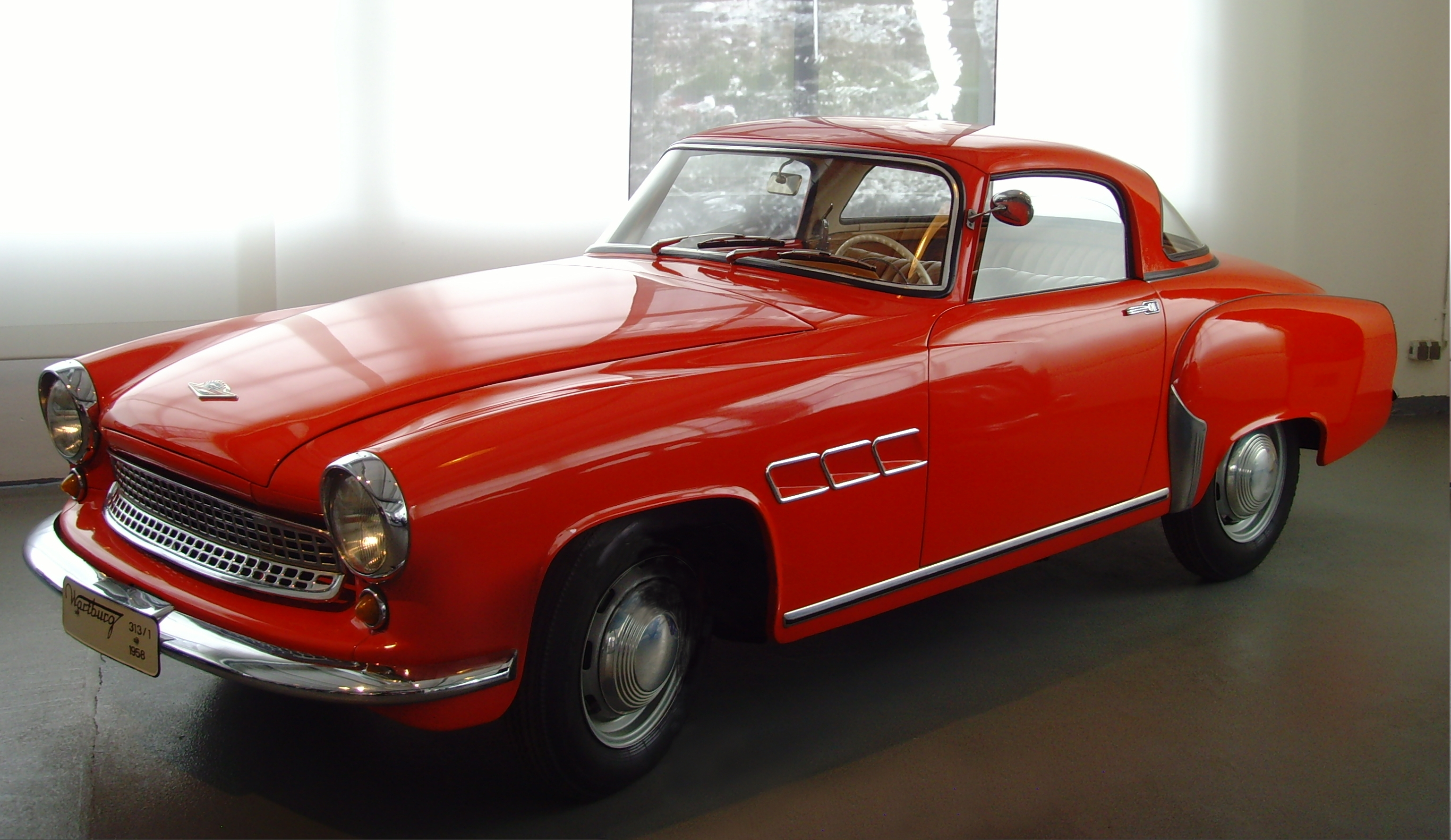
Wartburg 313 Sportcoupé - with hardtop as roadster: in production between 1957 and 1960

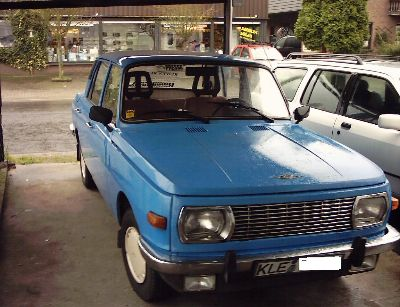
Wartburg 353: in production between 1966 and 1984

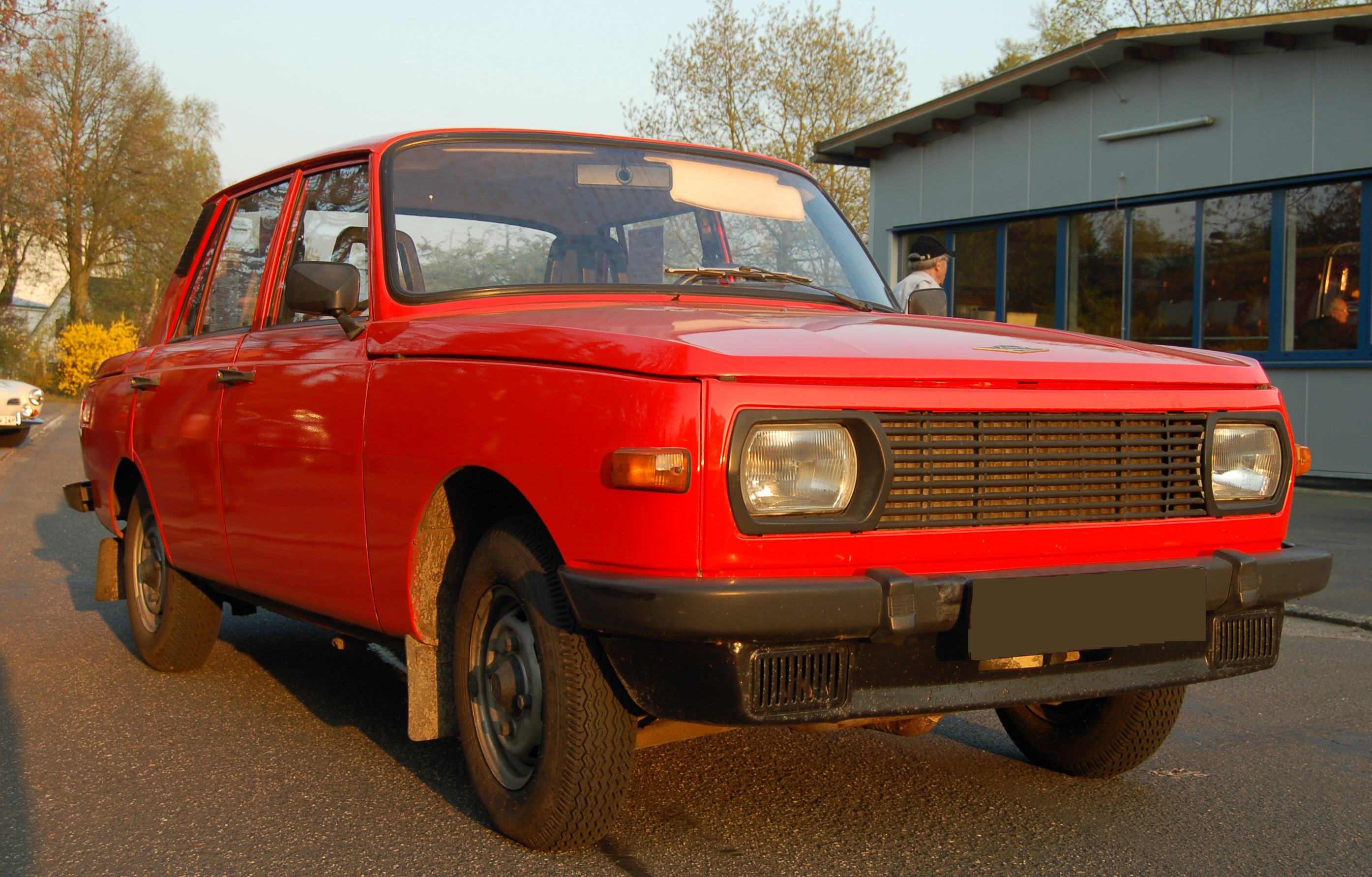
Wartburg 353W: in production between 1984 and 1985

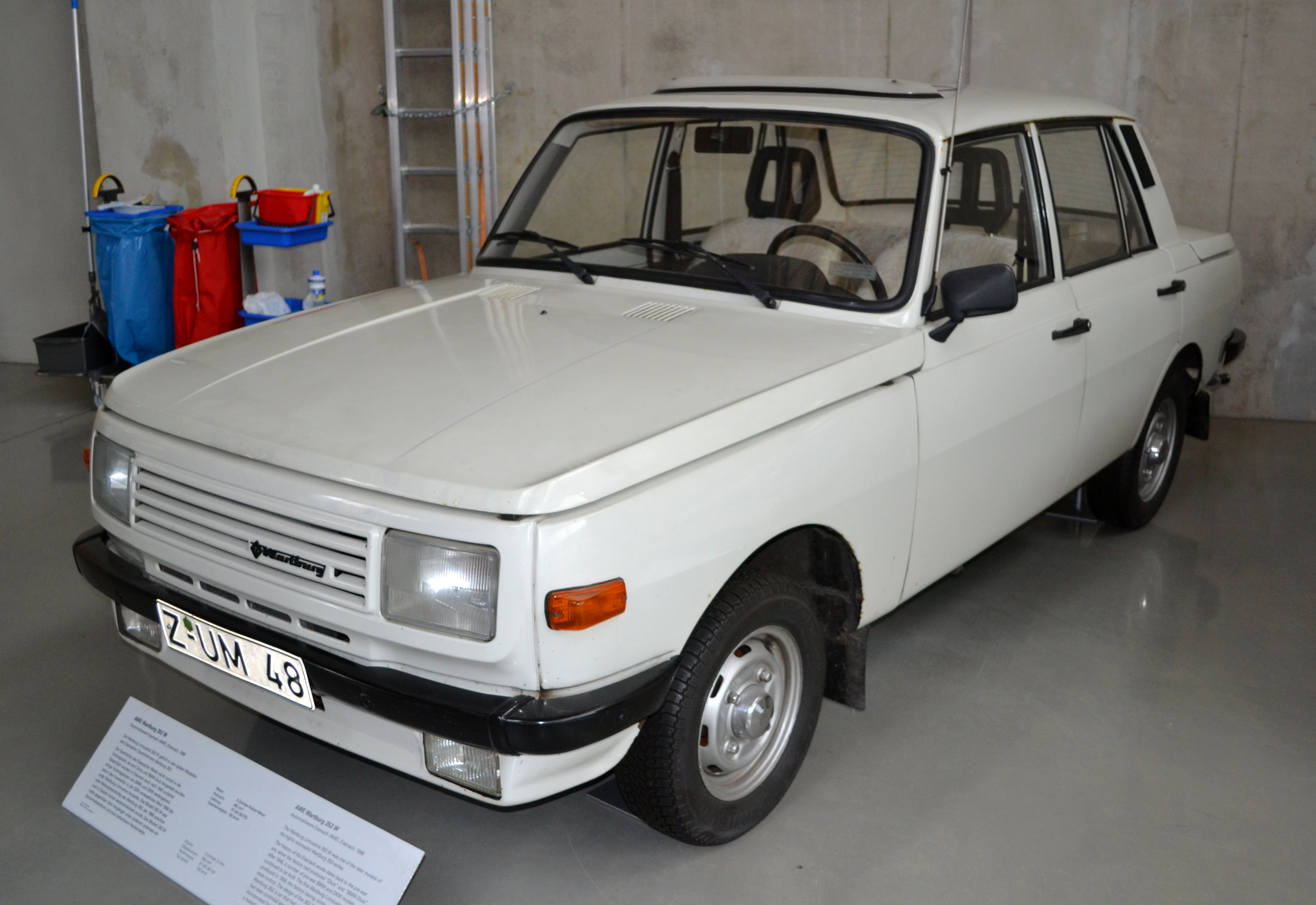
Wartburg 353W: Transport Center of the Deutsches Museum - Hall I.

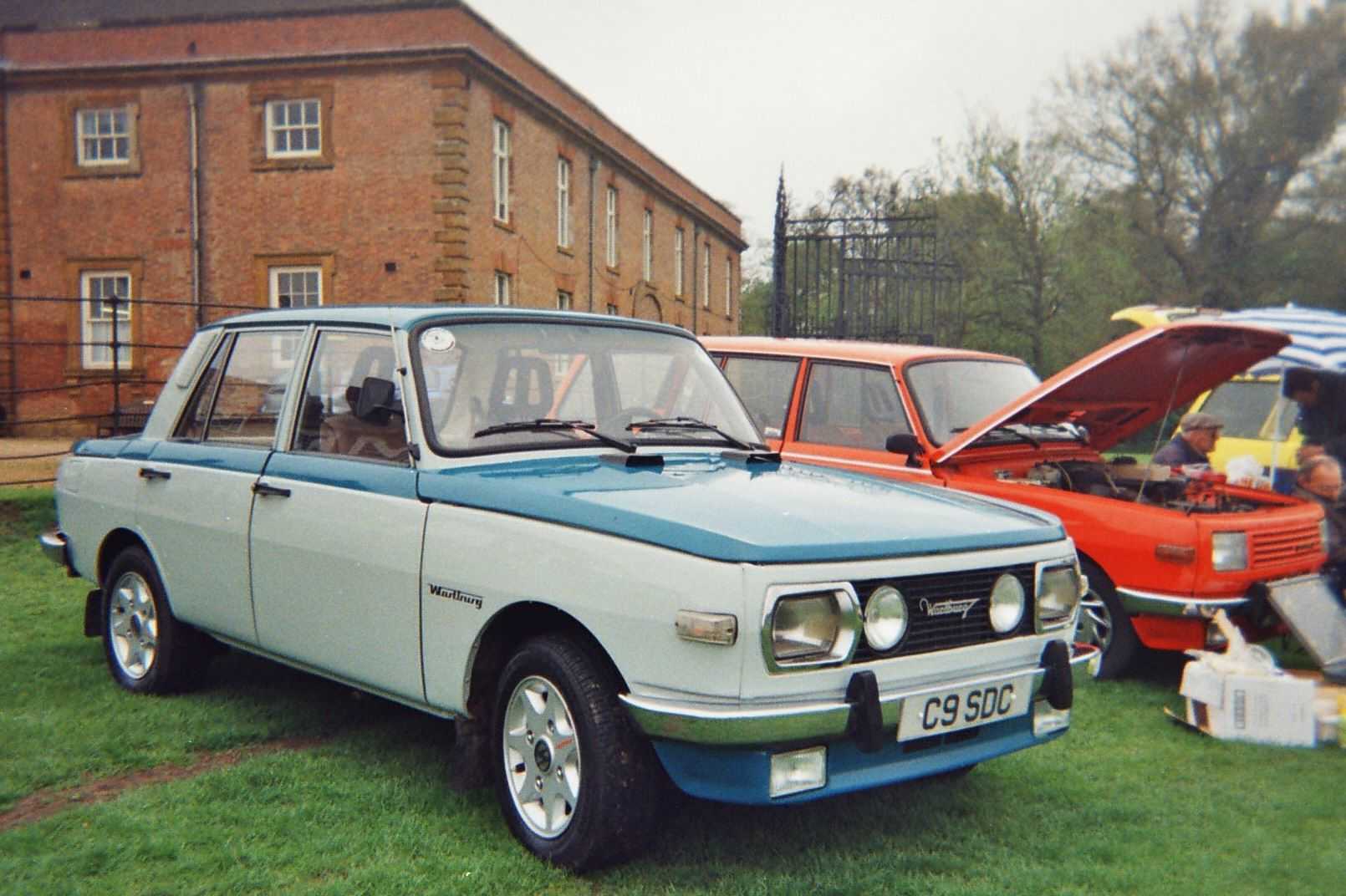
Wartburg 353 at the Stanford Hall Eastern European Car Rallye in 2006

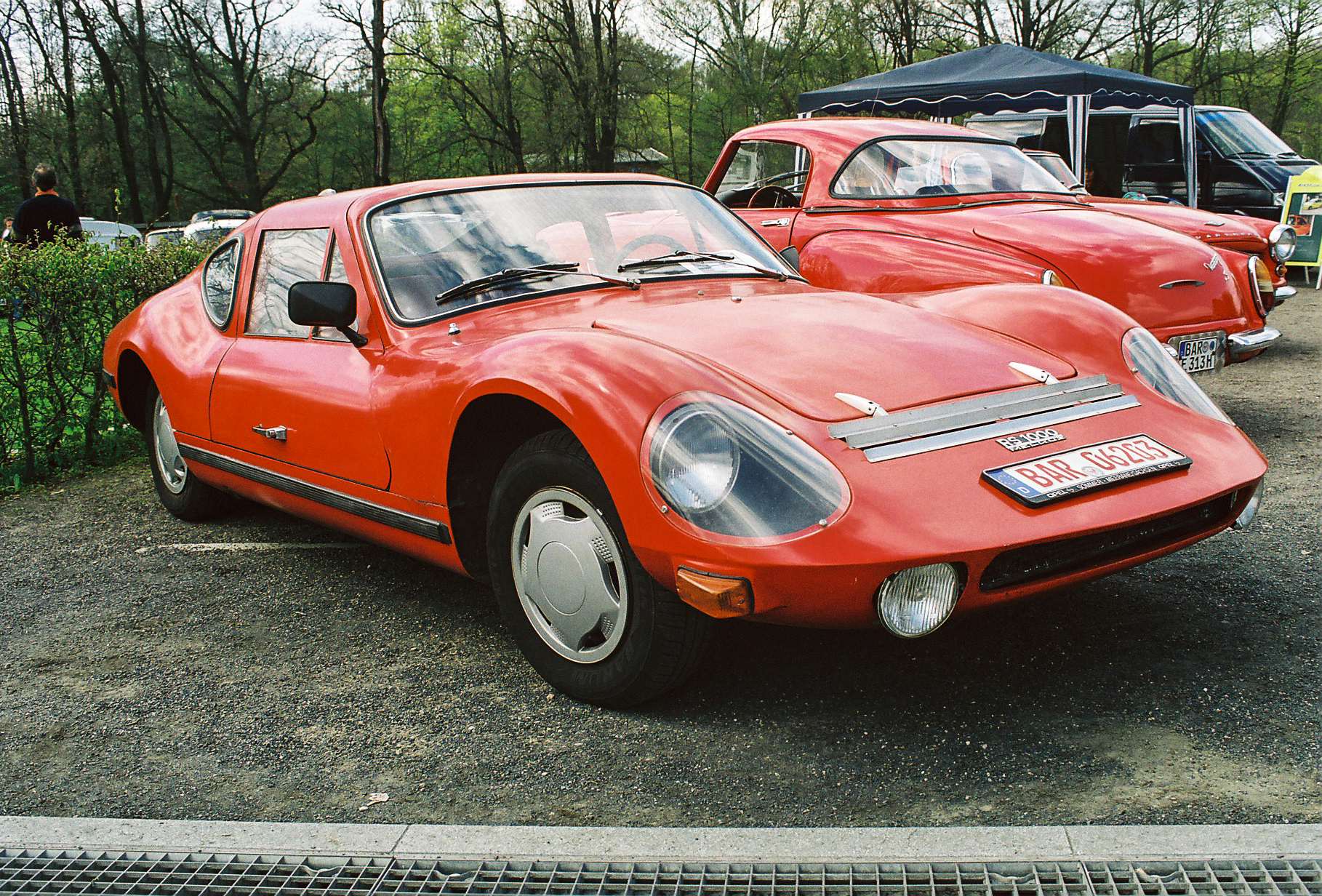
The Wartburg 353 based Melkus RS 1000 racing car

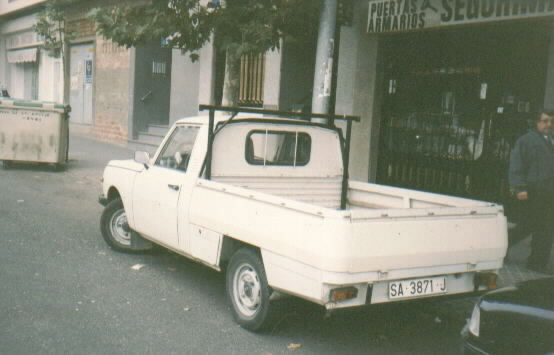
1988 Wartburg 353 pickup

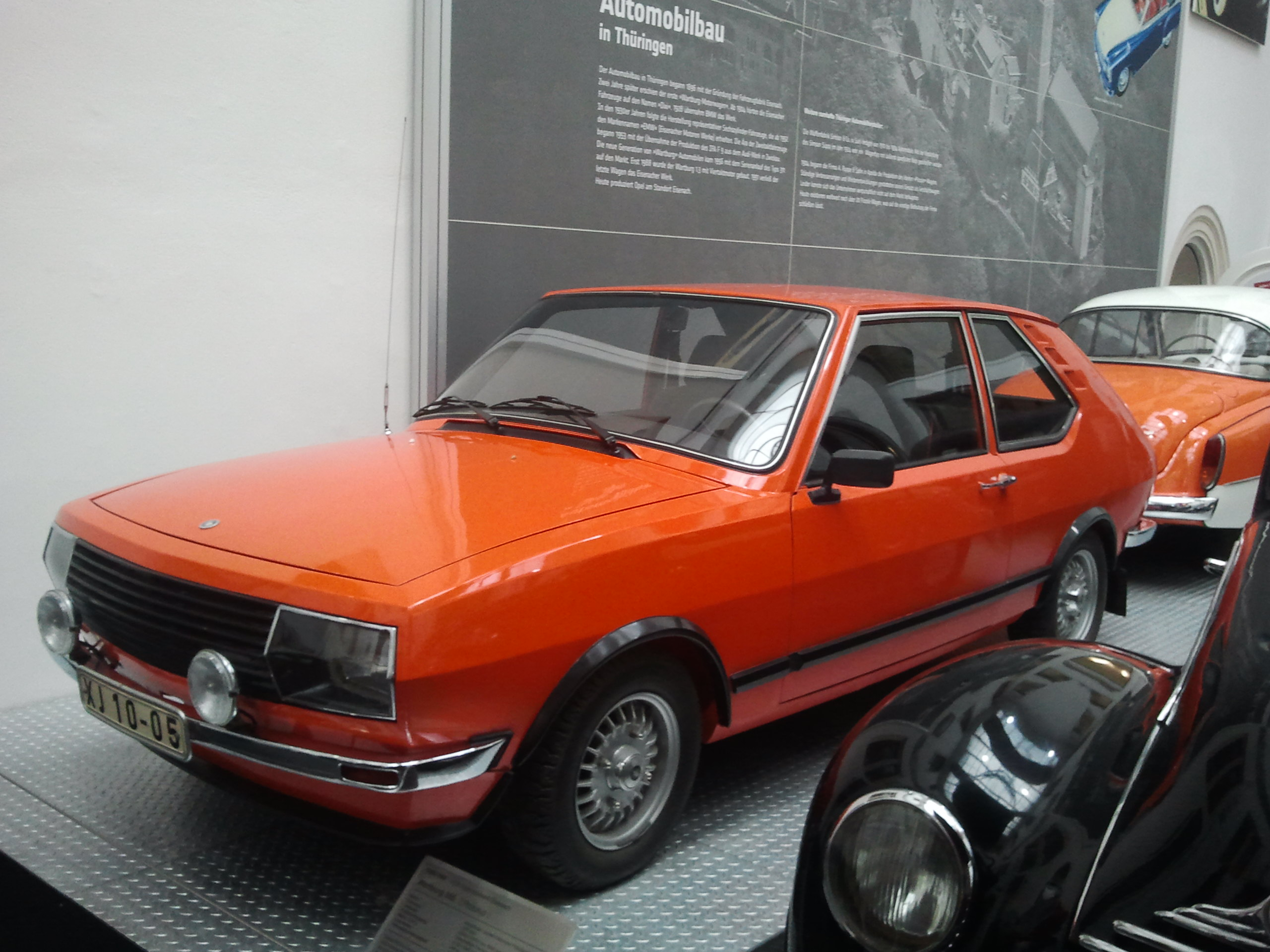
Wartburg 355 prototype

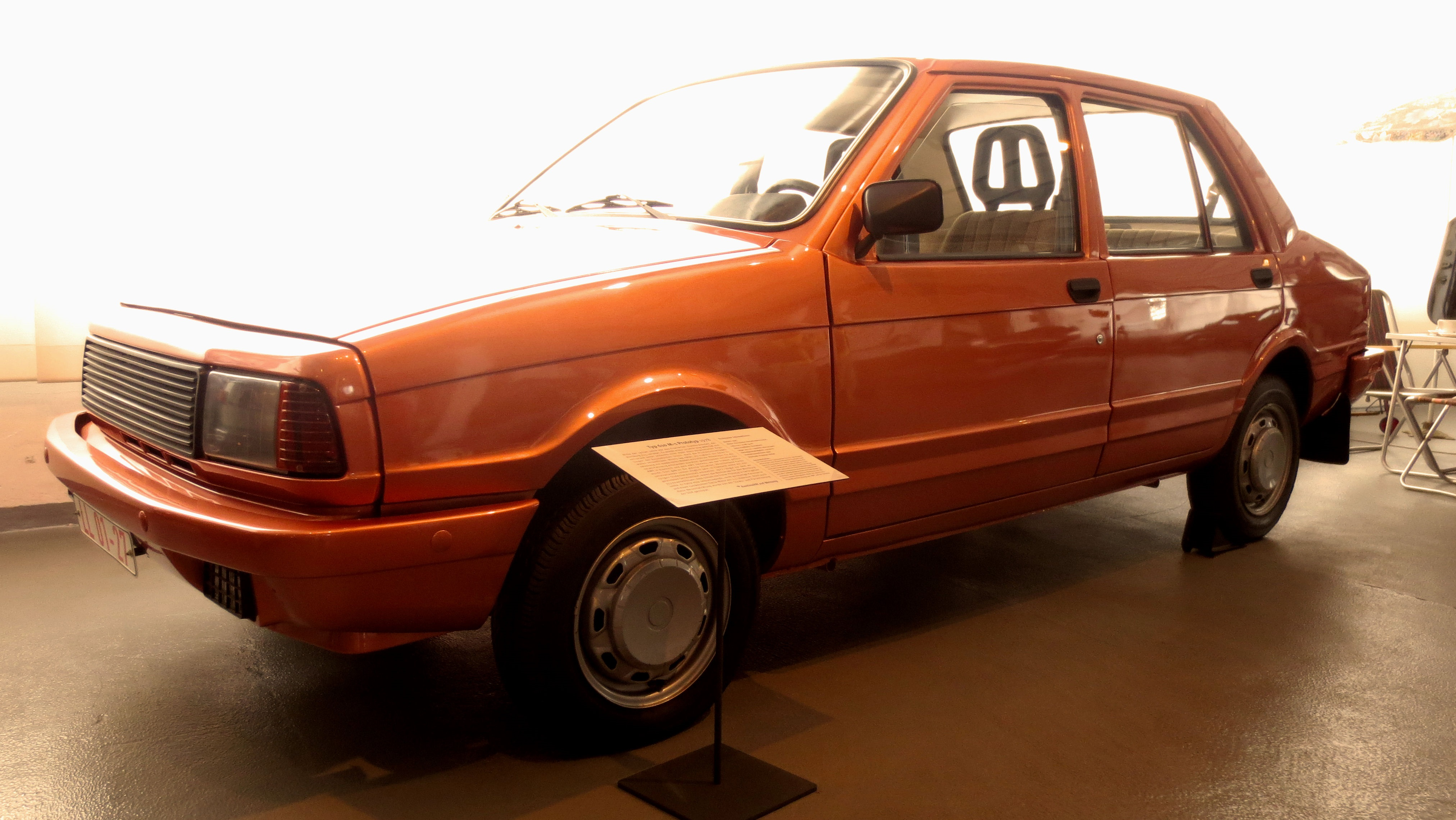
Wartburg 610M
