= Wartburg 1.3 =

East German car produced by Automobilwerk Eisenach (1988–1991)

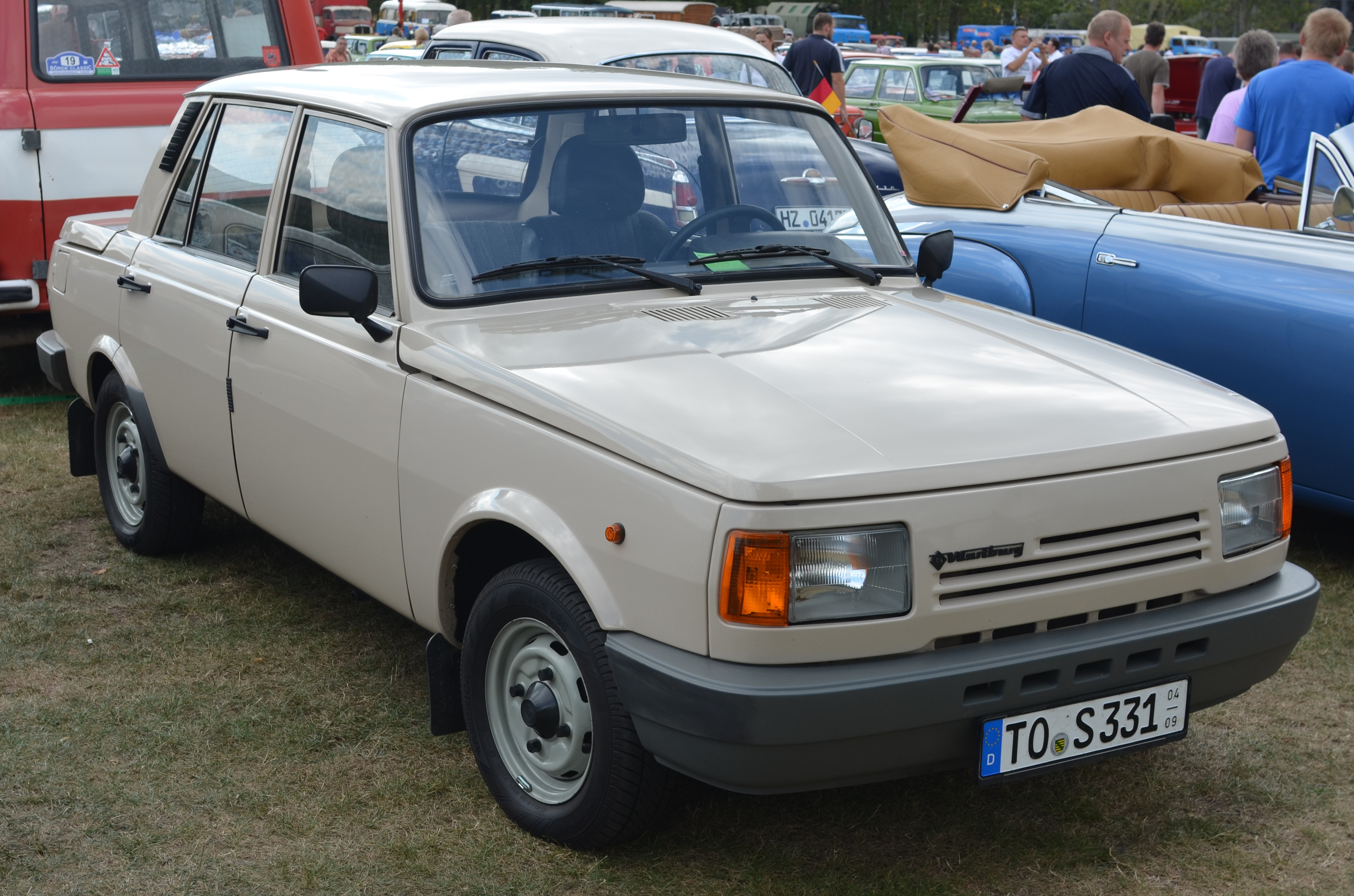
- Wartburg 1.3 saloon (Limousine)

Overview
- Manufacturer: Automobilwerk Eisenach
- Production: October 1988 – April 1991
- Assembly: East Germany: Eisenach (1988–1990); Germany: Eisenach (1990–1991)

Body and chassis
- Body style: saloon (Limousine); estate (Tourist); pickup (Trans)
- Layout: FF
- Related: Wartburg 353

Powertrain
- Engine: 1272 cc BM 860 four-stroke I4
- Transmission: 4-speed manual

Dimensions
- Wheelbase: 2,450 mm (96.5 in)
- Length: 4,216 mm (166.0 in)
- Width: 1,644 mm (64.7 in)
- Height: 1,495 mm (58.9 in)
- Kerb weight: 900–960 kg (1,984–2,116 lb)

Chronology
- Predecessor: Wartburg 353

The Wartburg 1.3 is a medium-sized family car which was produced by Automobilwerk Eisenach between October 1988 and April 1991. The car was an updated version of the Wartburg 353, with a 1.3-litre, four-stroke, four-cylinder engine as also used in the second generation Volkswagen Polo, instead of the original 1-litre, two-stroke, three-cylinder unit found in the 353.

== History ==
In 1984 a deal was reached in which IFA would assemble Volkswagen's 1.3-liter EA111 engine under license, in the Barkas plant in Karl-Marx-Stadt (Chemnitz). The engine was too long to be mounted longitudinally in the Wartburg 353, and too long to fit between the front wheels in a transverse installation. One prototype with the longitudinal engine was built, nicknamed Nasenbär (Coati) because of its long nose. Wartburg chose the transverse option, and thus the Wartburg 1.3 only entered production in October 1988 as a new transmission also had to be developed, as well as an entirely new front end (everything ahead of the A-pillar was new). The track was widened by 10 cm (3.9 in) in front and by 6 cm (2.4 in) in the rear, necessitating small fender extensions. The new drivetrain also meant that the gear shifter migrated to the floor, instead of on the column where it was usually found on Wartburgs. The considerable changes meant that the development costs far exceeded the projected expense of manufacturing the four-stroke 1600 cc engine developed by Wartburg's own engineers in the early seventies.

The appearance was also altered by the installation of a new front clip, with large wraparound turn signals and a smoothed-off appearance. Being rather expensive (nearly twice the price of the 353 W), the 1.3 sold slowly from the outset. The two-stroke 353 W continued to be built until 1989, when imported cars became available. Being a four-stroke was not enough of a novelty to convince buyers, especially in Western export markets. After the German reunification in October 1990, the Wartburg 1.3 was no longer competitive, and production slowed down until it was discontinued on 10 April 1991. A pickup version (not available within the Eastern Bloc) called the Wartburg 1.3 Trans was also available, although only about 920 were built. A total of 152,757 Wartburg 1.3 were built, about half of them intended for export.

The engine originally developed 58 PS (43 kW), after July 1990 this was increased to 64 PS (47 kW).

Karmann showed a more luxurious prototype based on the Tourist, called simply the "Tourist L". It had a glass sunroof, roof rails, tinted windows, and an upgraded interior. Irmscher developed a modernized, sportier-looking version with 14-inch alloy wheels called the 1.3 New Line. Wartburg could see the writing on the wall, however, and only two New Lines were built. A Wartburg 1.4 was also developed in 1990, with a Renault engine. This was in an attempt to lower costs (which were rising rapidly after the reunification) by thirty per cent, and the Barkas-built drivetrain was the most expensive part. One operational prototype was built, but it was decided to liquidate Automobilwerk Eisenach rather than continuing production.

The original AWE Wartburg plant closed in 1991 was replaced by the new Opel Eisenach joint venture, one building the Opel Vectra.

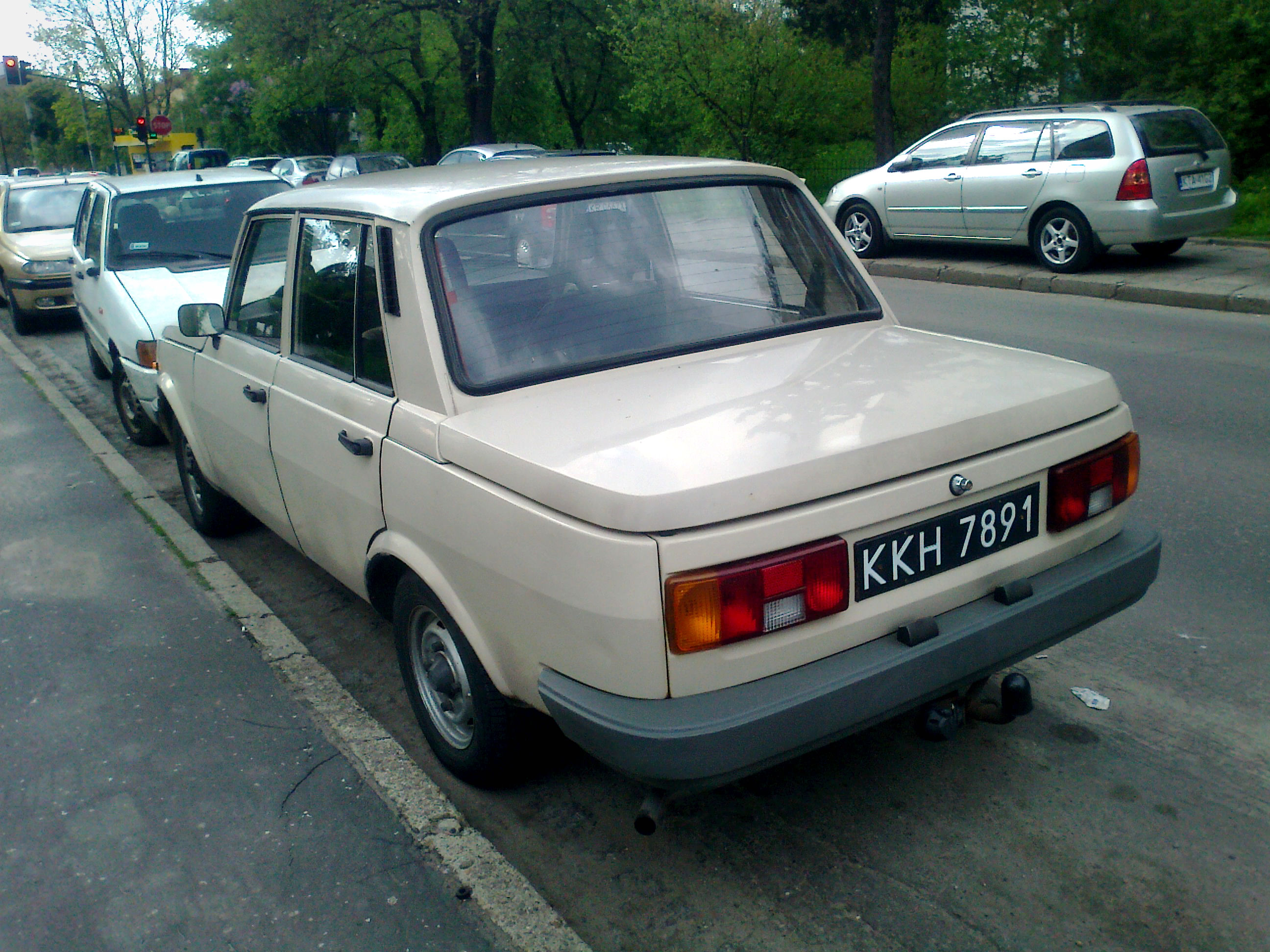
Rear view of the 1.3 saloon

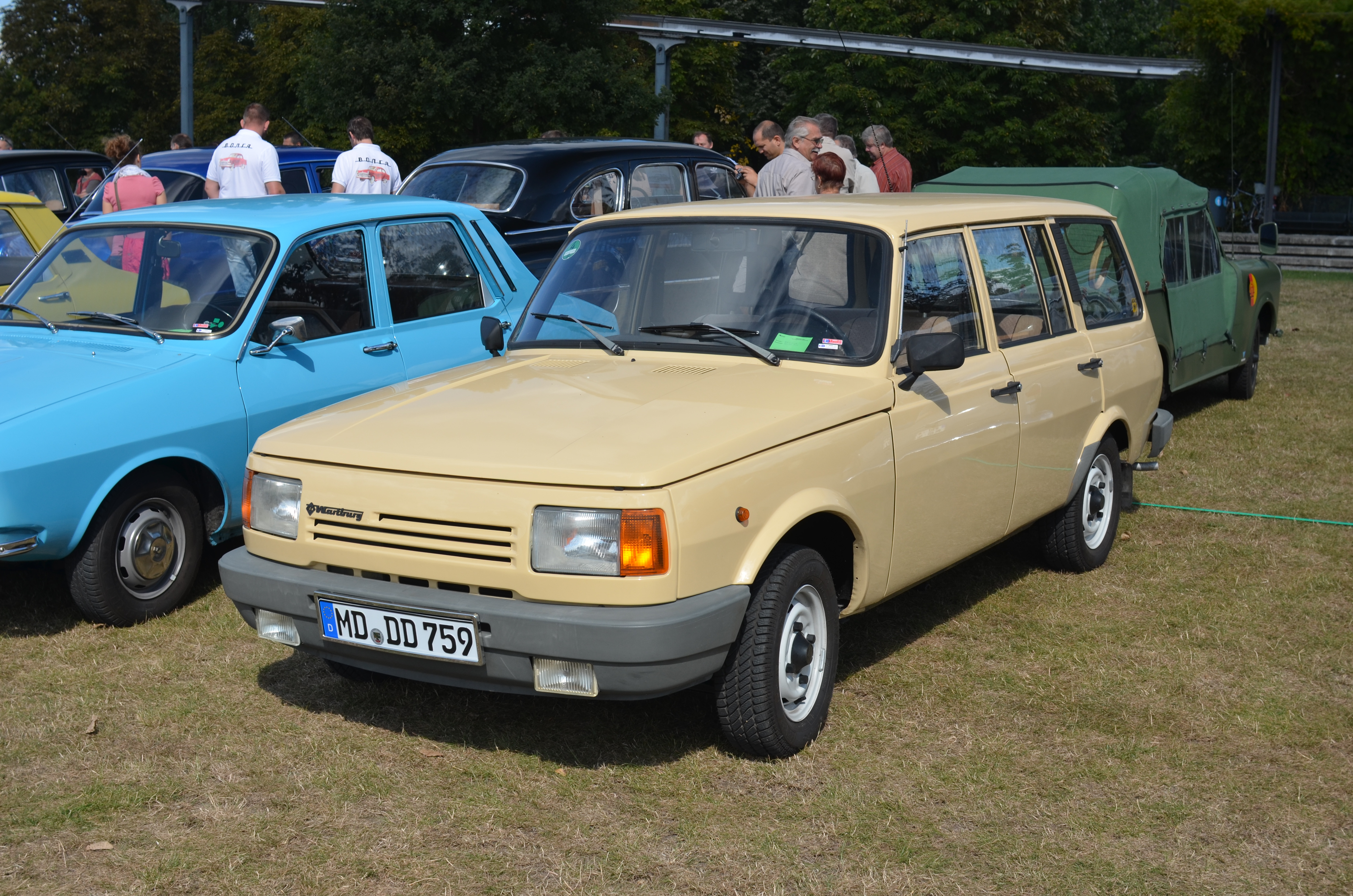
Wartburg 1.3 Tourist

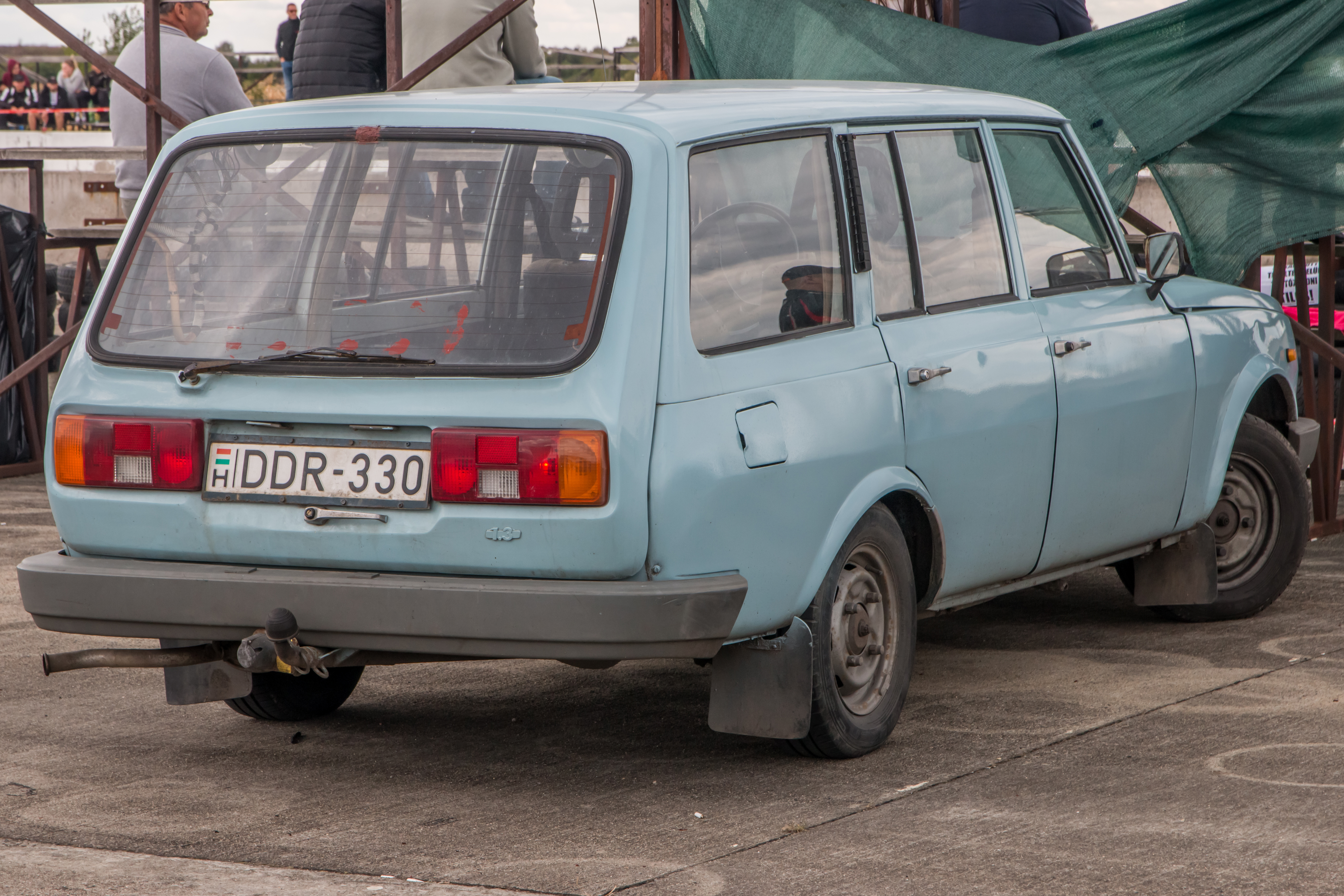
Wartburg 1.3 Tourist (rear view)

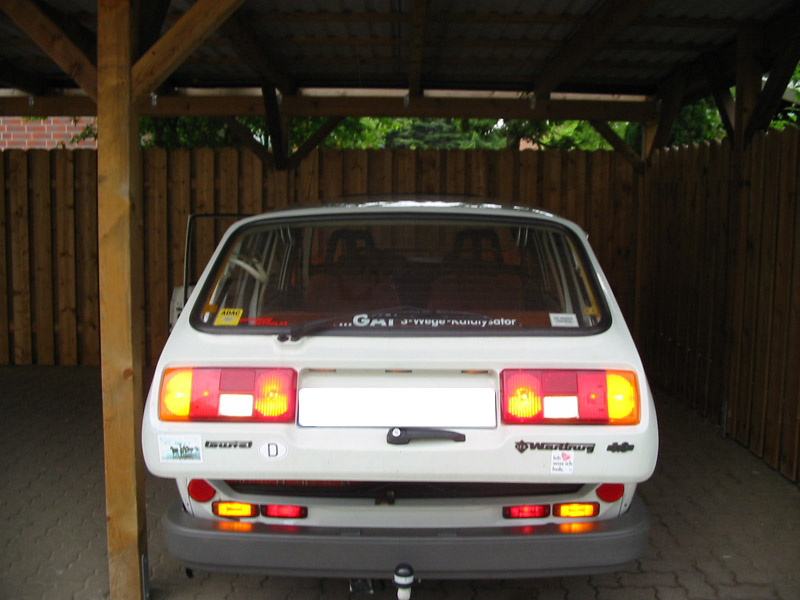
Since the taillights were mounted in the bootlid, additional lamps provided rearwards lighting when the boot was open.

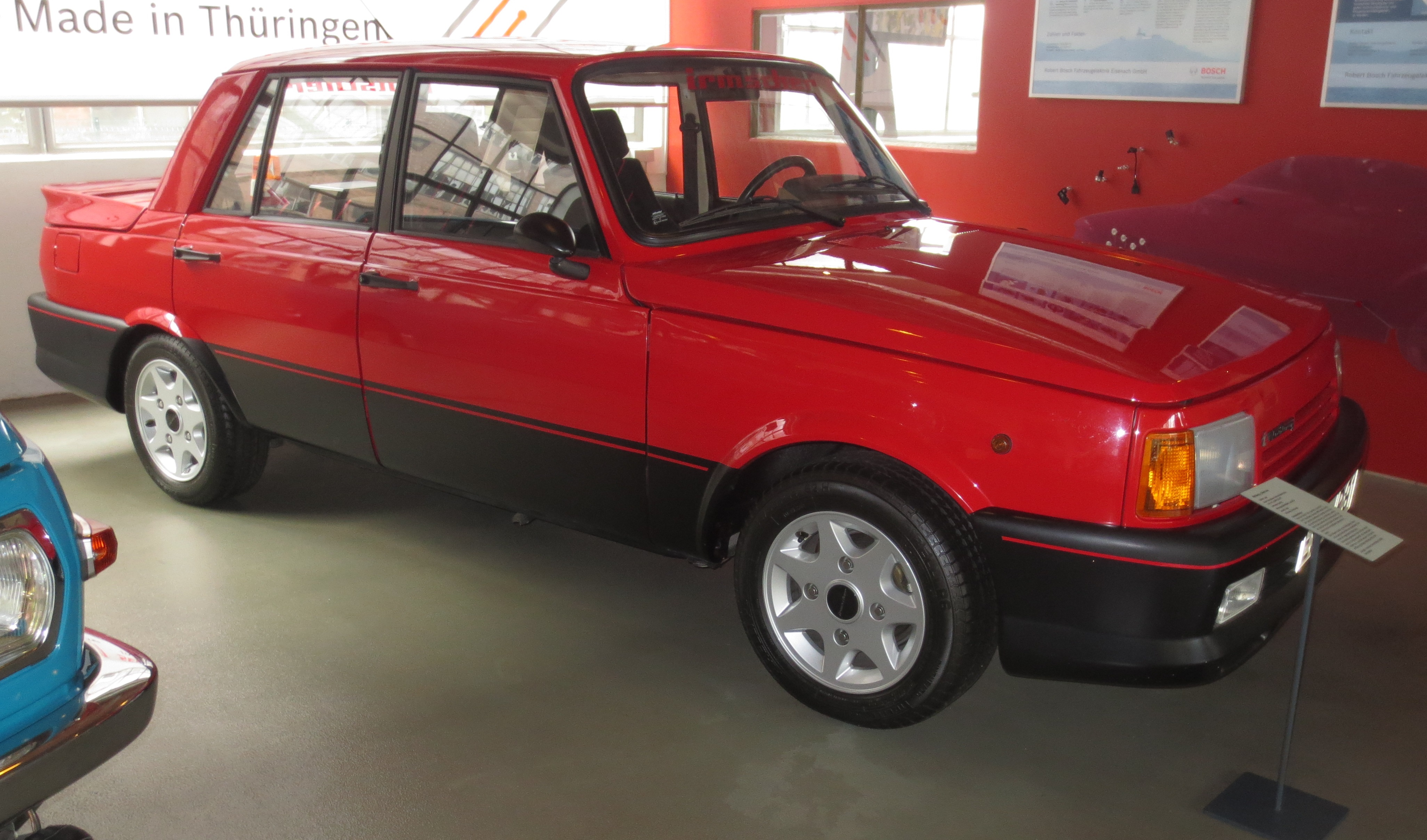
The Irmscher-developed Wartburg 1.3 New Line

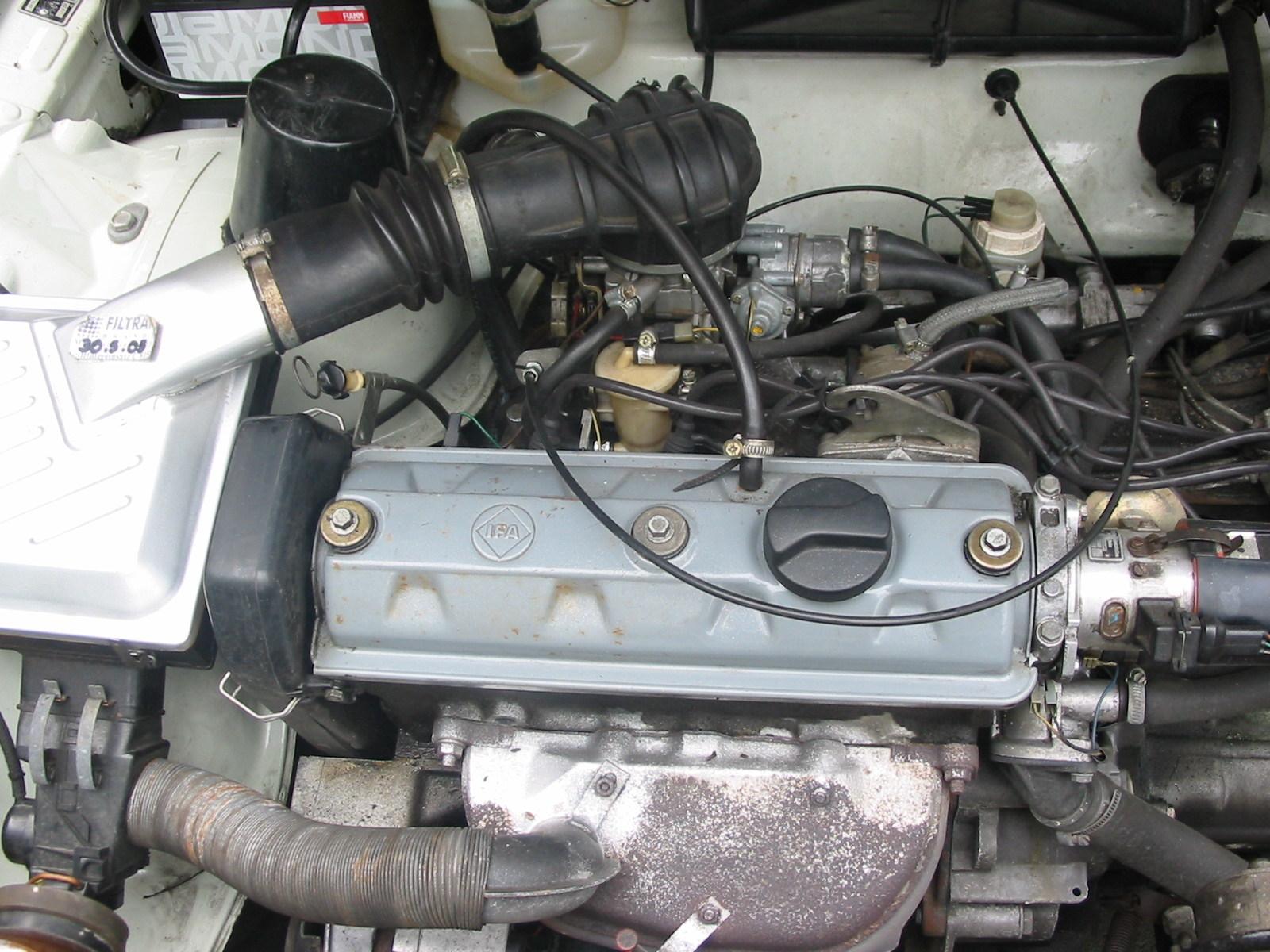
The transversely mounted EA111 engine

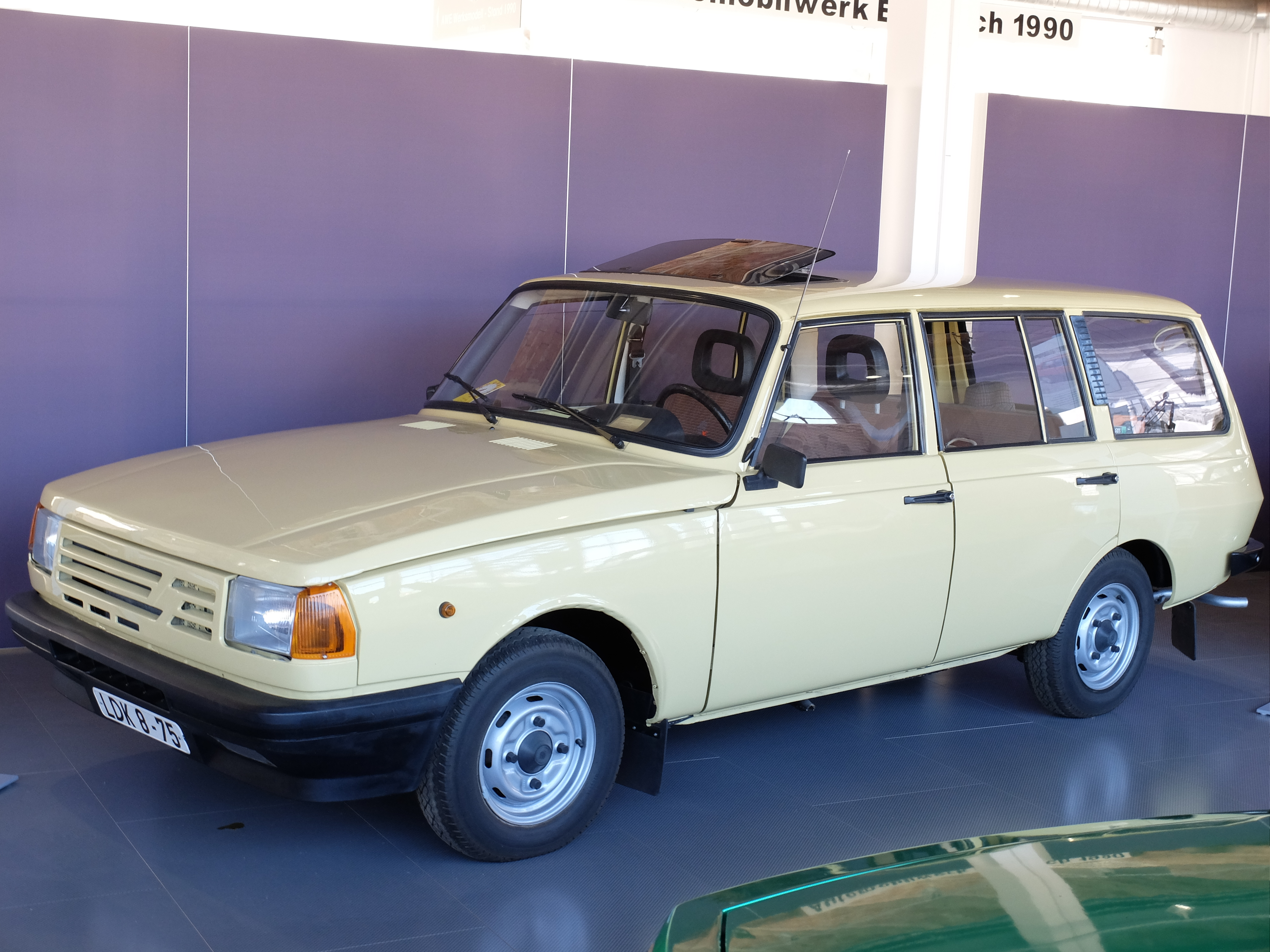
"Nasenbär" prototype with longitudinally mounted engine

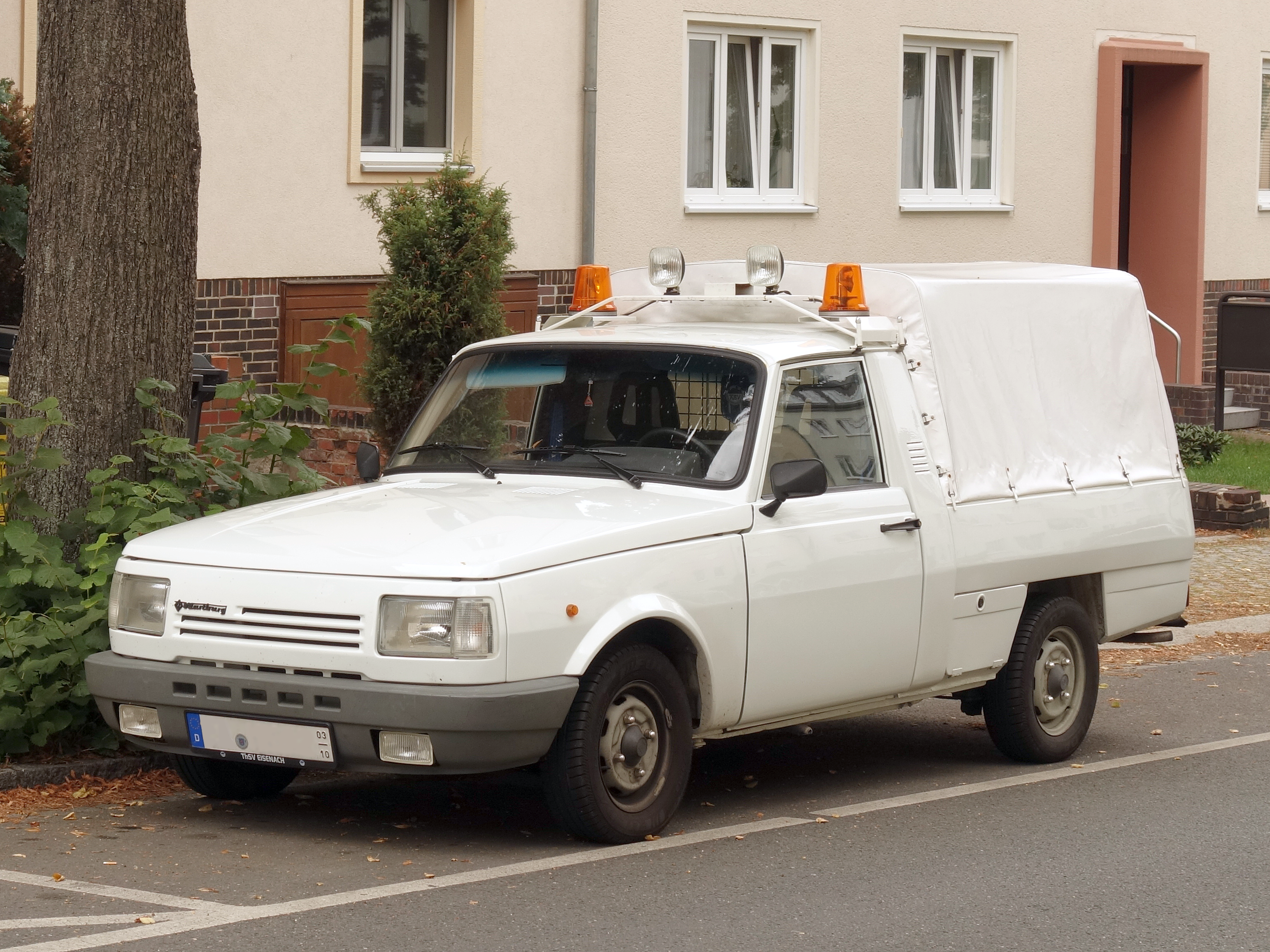
Wartburg 1.3 Trans Pickup
