= Wartburg 353 =

Medium-sized family car produced by AWE

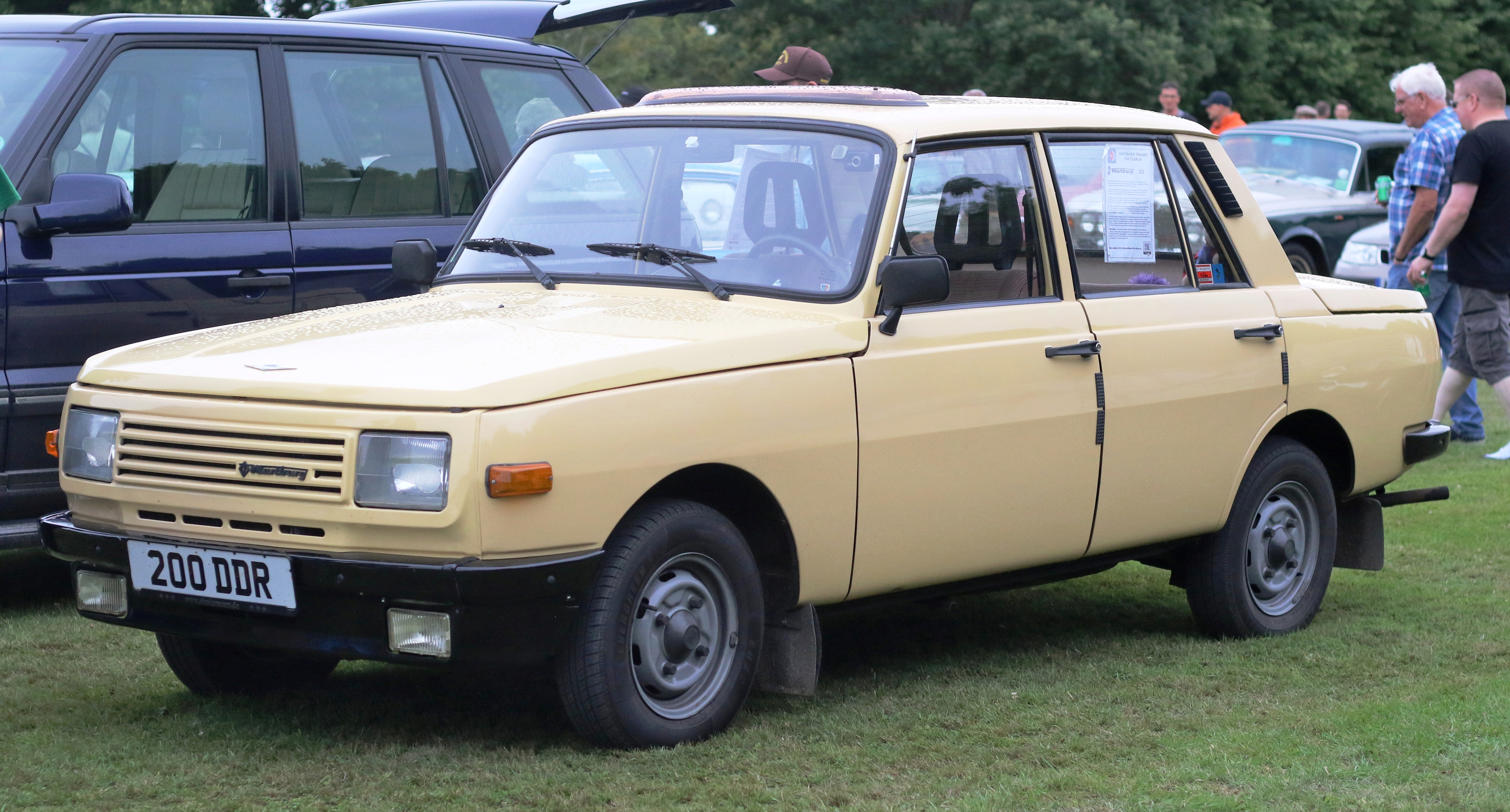
- 1988 Wartburg 353W

Overview
- Manufacturer: VEB Automobilwerk Eisenach (AWE)
- Also called: Wartburg Knight (export markets)
- Production: June 1966 – November 1989
- Assembly: East Germany: Eisenach
- Designer: Hans Fleischer, in cooperation with Clauss Dietel and Lutz Rudolph

Body and chassis
- Body style: 4-door saloon; 5-door estate; 2-door coupé utility (pickup)
- Layout: FF layout

Powertrain
- Engine: 993 cc two-stroke I3
- Transmission: 4-speed manual

Dimensions
- Wheelbase: 2,450 mm (96.5 in)
- Length: 4,220 mm (166.1 in)
- Width: 1,640 mm (64.6 in)
- Height: 1,490 mm (58.7 in)
- Curb weight: 920 kg (2,028 lb)

Chronology
- Predecessor: Wartburg 311
- Successor: Wartburg 1.3

The Wartburg 353, known in some export markets as the Wartburg Knight, is a medium-sized family car produced by the East German car manufacturer AWE for their Wartburg brand. It was the successor of the Wartburg 311 and was itself succeeded by the Wartburg 1.3.

The Wartburg 353 was produced from 1966 to 1989, becoming the Wartburg with the longest production run. During its lifetime, it saw several changes and improvements, the most recognizable of which came in 1985 with a front facelift (as pictured here), a slightly different layout around the engine block, and a new carburettor.

== Design ==
First introduced in June 1966, the Wartburg 353 was the creation of the former German BMW production facilities (called EMW under Soviet occupation). Its origins were ultimately derived from a 1938 DKW design and powered by a two-stroke engine with only seven major moving parts: three pistons, three connecting rods and a crankshaft. This led to a common aphorism among Wartburg owners, which is that "one drives a car, but only has to maintain a motorcycle." The engine was almost identical to the DKW- derived two-stroke unit used in the SAAB 93,95 and 96.

Domestically, it was used for all government transportation, sometimes as a Volkspolizei police car. However, due to the nature of the planned economy, deliveries to private owners could take ten to fifteen years.

Like other Eastern Europe cars, it was known for its low price in export markets. Because of its forward centre of gravity and front-wheel drive, the car had typical front-wheel-drive road handling characteristics, displaying significant understeer, especially in wet conditions.

Wartburgs were exported to most European markets and South Africa.

== Engine and transmission ==
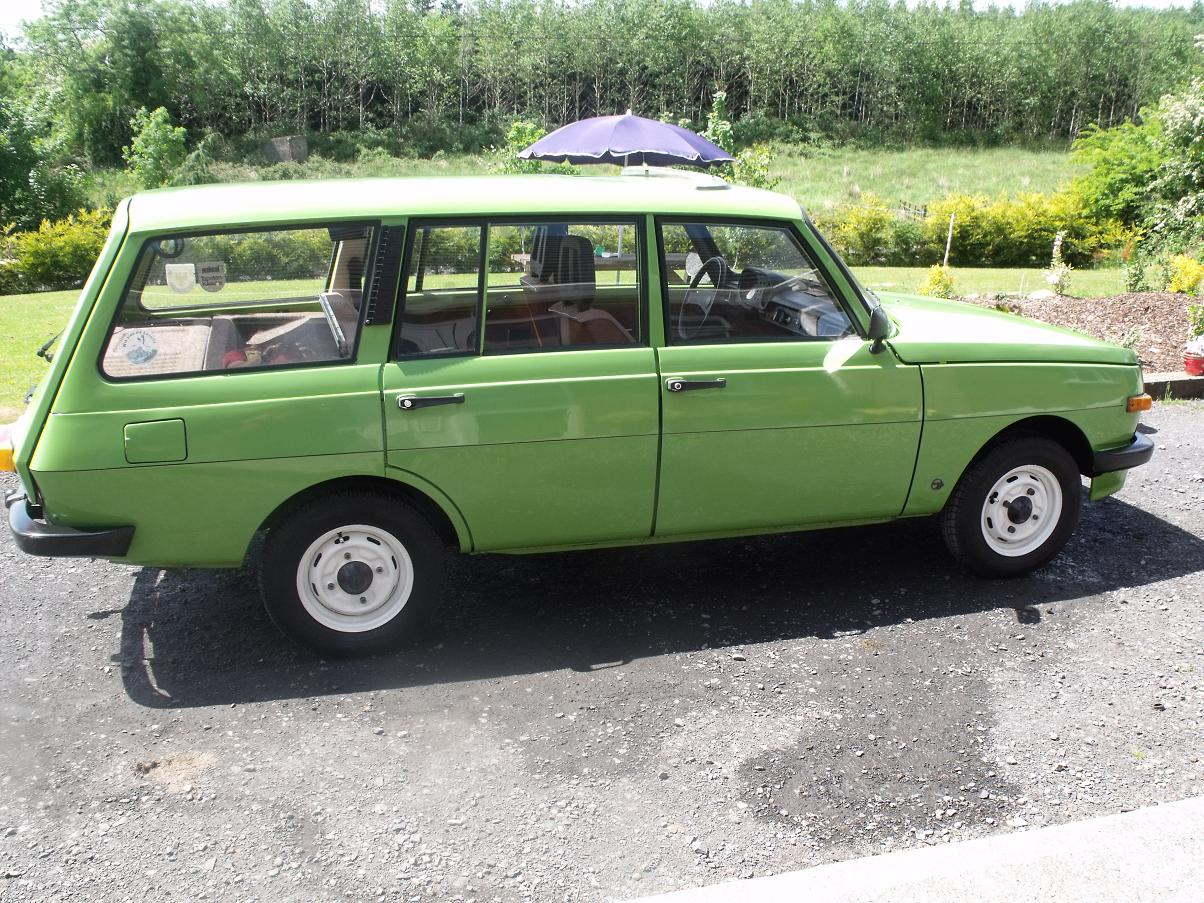
1984–1988 Wartburg 353 Tourist in Ireland

The Wartburg 353 was powered by a 1-litre displacement, 3-cylinder unit that took almost two decades to refine. While developing about 50 to 55 PS (37 to 40 kW) (depending on the carburetor type), its two-stroke engine design provided more than 100 N⋅m of torque (106 N⋅m in the last version), which was a typical figure for many larger four-stroke engines at that time. The three cylinder two-stroke design made for a very smooth drive, described as being as smooth as a six-cylinder four stroke by owners. The transmission was equipped with a freewheel, obviating the need to use the clutch between gears. Designed as a fuel efficiency measure and as a means of protecting the engine from oil starvation due to the petroil-fuelled nature of 2-strokes, the device disabled engine braking; the car could coast whenever the throttle was released. Drivers could turn the freewheel off through a switch under the steering column to benefit from engine braking, which was useful since the front brakes were prone to overheating and fading. However, most drivers never disabled the freewheel because it made shifting gears significantly easier and smoother, though not quicker. It also allowed clutchless though slow gear changes to be made. Earlier models had the gear stick on the steering column, although later versions had it on the floor. Inherited from its DKW origins, the ignition system featured no distributor but three coils and contact breakers, one for each cylinder.

Today, 353s are customized for reaching speeds well about 200 km/h (125 mph), whereas the original design called for critical speed of 150–155 km/h (93–96 mph) and 12 seconds to accelerate to 100 km/h (62 mph), which was dealt with in second gear due to the smooth high-revving engine. It was available with four- and five-speed transmissions, although the latter was rare.

== Popularity ==
The 353 was a reasonable success throughout the Eastern bloc, with front-wheel drive. Its negatives were due to its outmoded two-stroke engine. However, in the Western European markets, the Wartburg was quite competitive especially because of its relatively high maximum power of 58 hp at 5400rpm and top speed of 170 km/h which was uncommon for passenger cars of this engine size, owing to its refined two-stroke engine design.

The last modernisation of Wartburg took place in 1988 when the car got the new designation "1.3" and a four-stroke VW-designed engine with a 1.3-liter displacement. In 1991, Opel bought the plant and Wartburg production ceased. Resale values were extremely low, and in Finland, official figures on removals from the car register gave Wartburg the shortest average life span of all listed manufacturers, at nine years and three months.

The Wartburg 353 was commonly nicknamed "Trustworthy Hans" or "Farty Hans" by owners due to its durability and copious exhaust emissions, especially when cold and/or overoiled. Noteworthy characteristics of the model are simple design, spacious interior with flat floor between driver and front passenger, smooth engine, dependability, occasional and cheap maintenance, strong chassis-based car frame, front-wheel drive handling, rear-wheel ABS regulator, a 525-litre trunk, and innovative electronic gauges fitted after 1983. Disadvantages in terms of passengers' comfort are well known too: lack of any sound dampening led to significant engine feedback through the body panels, whose boomy reverberation led to another nickname, "The barrel". The suspension provided sensibly different handling and comfort when the car was empty and carrying passengers and luggage. Owners' accounts are that control and smoothness improved the more the car was loaded.

It was also available as a pickup version named Wartburg 353 Trans but was unsuccessful, mainly due to limited payload (only 450 kg) and low transport volume. It was mainly used for small deliveries. This car was only sold for export, as it would have been useful mostly to the illegal private business endeavors in East Germany.

Wartburg owners' clubs exist throughout Europe and some Wartburgs are still used as rally racing cars.

== Production ==
Over a million Wartburg 353s were produced overall.

Production figures (1966–1988)

- 1966–1975 Wartburg 353: 356,330 built
- 1975–1988 Wartburg 353 W: 868,860 built

== Model development ==
The transition model Wartburg 312, with the body of the Wartburg 311 and the underpinnings of the later Wartburg 353, appeared on September 1, 1965, with chassis number 65,533. From June 1, 1966, vehicles from VIN 1:30 001 received the new body, associated with a change in the type designation of "1000" to "353". A new transmission was received on July 1, 1966, all vehicles from chassis number 001 02:14. The car entered the British market as the Wartburg Knight in early 1967, and a year later, the estate "Tourist" model followed.

The introduction of the estate version Wartburg Tourist with the VEB Karosseriewerke Halle (Saale) made body was carried in 1968. tailgate and rear fenders were made of glass fiber-reinforced plastic. First, the Tourist was manufactured with a smooth C-pillar, in 1970 a forced ventilation system with air outlets in the C-pillar was introduced.

From chassis number 04.10 474, on 6 May 1969, the new Type 353-1 engine with 36.8 kW (50 PS) was introduced. In 1970 ( exactly on 18 June 1969- according to Mr. Horst Ihling's publication "Wartburg - Help Yourself" ), round instruments replaced the earlier "bathroom scale" type, and in 1972 bucket seats replaced the earlier types. Also in 1972, an optional floor shifter was introduced, but it did not function very well and saw limited sales. and Since 3 March 3, 1975 (from chassis number 10.06 948) the vehicle became the Wartburg 353 W. The W stood for Weiterentwicklung, German for "development". First shown in 1974, the 353 W received front disc brakes (of Czech manufacture) and many other safety changes such as rollbelts, a collapsible steering column, and dual circuit hydraulic brakes. The body remained unchanged.

From chassis number 17:20 932, on vehicles produced after 14 June 1982, the carburetor was switched to a Jikov 32 Sedr with pre-heated intake mixture (upgrading older models was not suggested), new brake drums rear and H4 headlights.

From 2 January 1984, the "S" version replaced the "de luxe," produced from chassis 19:00 401. The model was characterized by matt black PVC door window frames, imitation leather trim and wood grain, trunk liner, fog lights (front and rear), two-tone horn, heated rear window and a Malimo corduroy interior. In addition, all models that until then had chromed body parts received black plastic powder-coated ones. This was both a sign of a shortage of raw materials in the East German economy and an attempt to keep up with the prevailing tastes.

As with the DKW, Wartburgs had the radiator mounted behind the engine. This changed as of 30 June 1985 (from chassis number 20:24 100) as the radiator was moved to the usual position in front of the engine. The front clip was also redesigned and was now a one-piece body-coloured unit incorporating the grille opening. The previous bulged rectangle-shaped headlights were replaced with rectangular, slightly swept-back units.

=== Replacements ===
In 1968 the Wartburg 355, equipped with a 1.4-litre Renault engine, was developed but only six were built until the project was cancelled in 1973. The 355 had a modern three-dour coupé bodywork in GRP. T

In the mid-seventies, a joint project with Škoda and Trabant, led to the development of a Czech-engined design called the 610M. The plug was pulled on this project as the oil crisis had made it impossible to invest in the new plants that would have been required.

The Wartburg engineers developed several four-stroke versions, none accepted for series production. In 1972 a four-stroke inline-four of 1.6 liters producing 82 PS (60 kW) was developed, but the political leadership canceled the project in favor of a facelift. A slack in demand abroad was compensated for by rising demand within East Germany, made possible by wage increases. In the early eighties, as two-strokes were becoming harder and harder to sell, the technical team developed a four-stroke version of the 993 cc three-cylinder unit. Despite good performance in tests, this, too, remained stillborn.

It was not until 1984 when the license for producing Volkswagen's 1272 cc inline-four was gained, that Wartburg had its chance. Deliveries of the Wartburg 1.3 finally began in October 1988, much too late to help AWE survive the reunification.

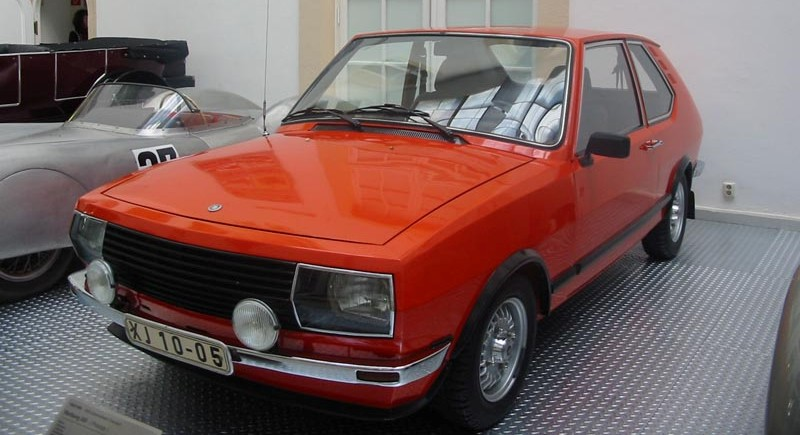
Renault-engined Wartburg 355 Coupé (1978)

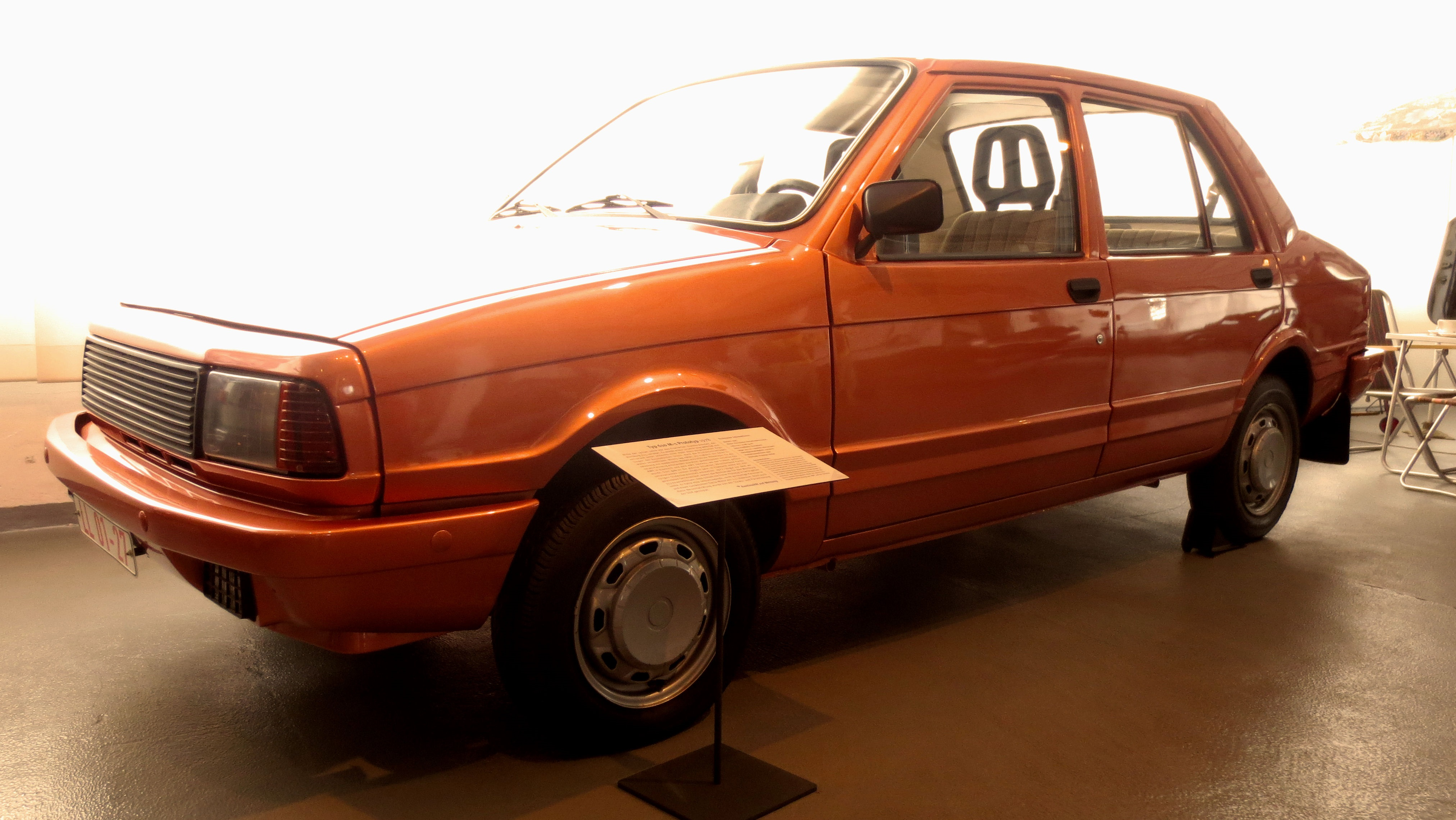
Wartburg 610M (1977)

== Competition ==
The 353 was campaigned extensively, mostly as a rally car. For instance, a 353 driven by Niebergall and Froman finished tenth overall in the 1976 Acropolis Rally. Its best world championship rallying result was a second place in the 1973 Polish Rally, three hours behind the winner. Only one more car reached the finish.

In 1978 during November's RAC Rally, the final round of the World Rally Championship, all four Works Team Wartburg 353W entries of Heimburger/Weitz, Hartwich/Wilss, Heitzmann/Fromman & Seltmann/Hoffmann completed the 715 km course over 3 days and nights. The course consisted of narrow, snowy and icy gravel forest tracks of the Scottish Border country; the Kielder Forest; and the Lake District, North Yorkshire. Seeded and numbered 80, 81, 105, and 104 of the entrants, the cars finished 37th, 44th, 53rd and 54th of 61 finishers; 107 entries of other marques had suffered mechanical failure, crashed or retired. Second only in speed to Skoda of the "Eastern Bloc" entries, the Wartburgs proved formidably durable and reliable vehicles.

The 353's last World Rally Championship result was at the 1993 1000 Lakes Rally, where Alpo Saastamoinen finished 53rd overall and fifth in class (A/5).

== Model range ==
- Saloon, four-door
- Kombi, five-door ("Tourist") (Estate)
- Pickup, two-door ("Trans") (coupé utility)
- Prototypes / Special vehicles
  - Wartburg 355 (Renault-engined prototype)
  - Wartburg with gas turbines -drive
  - Wartburg Rallye Trans (2 built)
  - Wartburg 353 Rally Duo, one twin-engined prototype
  - Wartburg 353 WR, Group B rally car
  - Wartburg 353 W460, rally car
  - CMEA car 610 M, developed together with Škoda
  - Wartburg 360 (similar to the Audi 80 in appearance)
  - Wartburg 400 (Kubel, Wartburg for NVA )
  - Wartburg 760 (nicknamed the "pot-bellied pig", this was a projected collaboration with Škoda meant to replace the 353 as well as the Trabant and the Škoda 100)

== Special editions ==
=== Ambulance ===
MED-ambulance emergency vehicle of the Red Cross of the GDR in the field of rapid medical aid (SMH), urgent medical aid (DMH), and the urgent house call service (DHD) with a total of 100 vehicles, of which four were in the service of the National People's Army (NVA)

=== Police ===
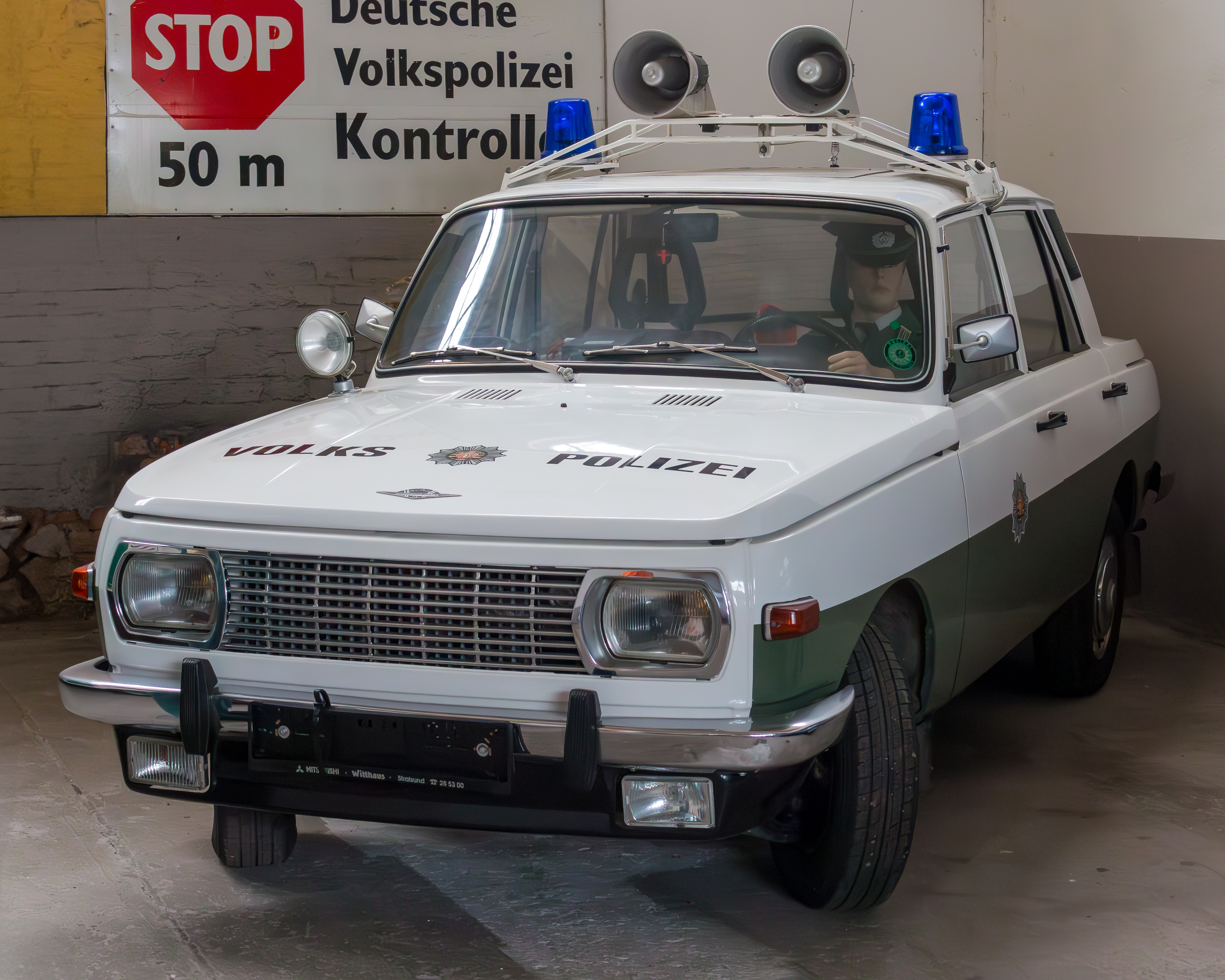
Volkspolizei Wartburg 353

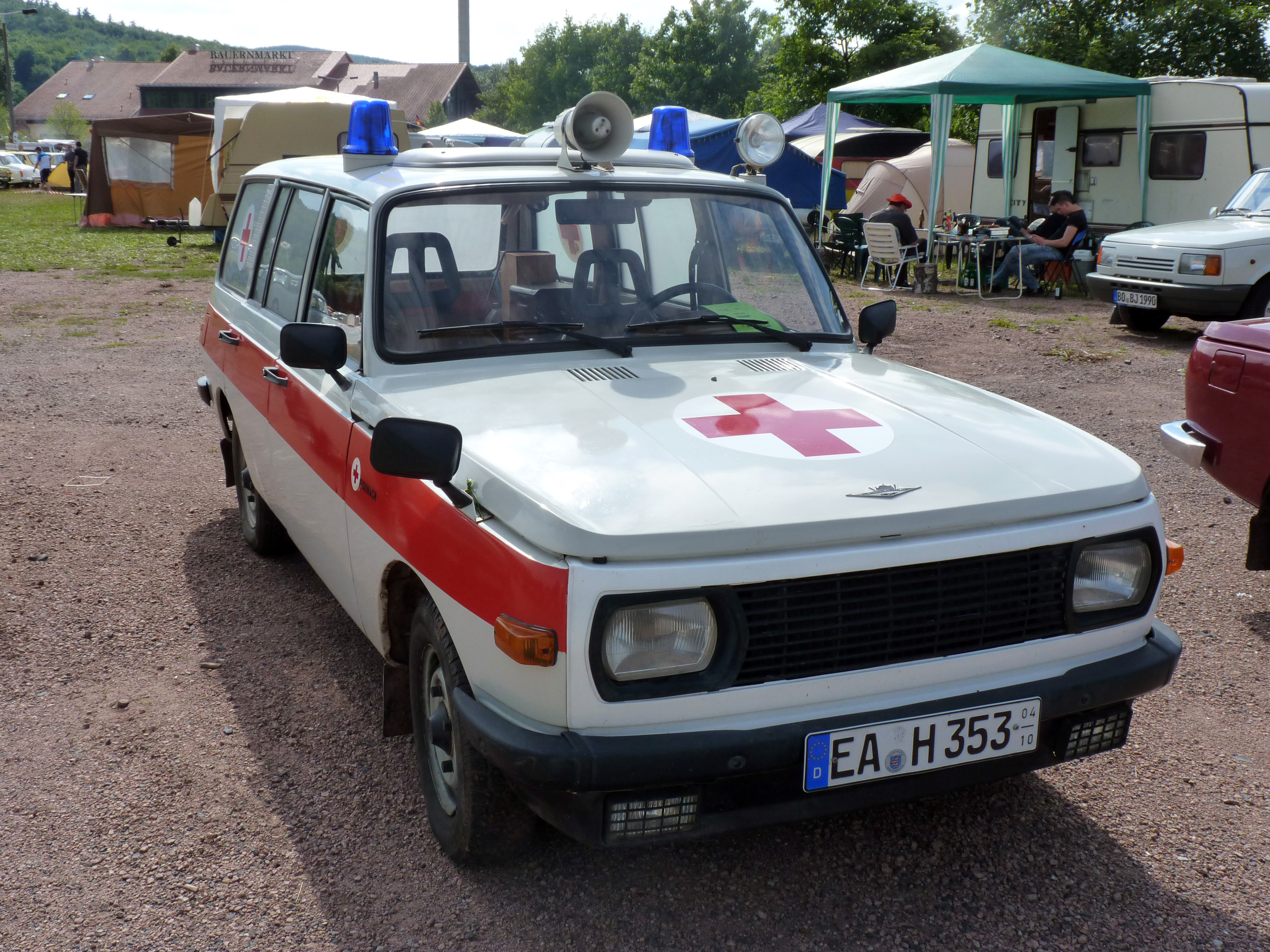
Wartburg 353W Tourist-based ambulance

=== Melkus ===
The Melkus RS1000 is a sports car from Melkus developed from the Wartburg 353 and built from 1969 to 1979.

== Gallery ==
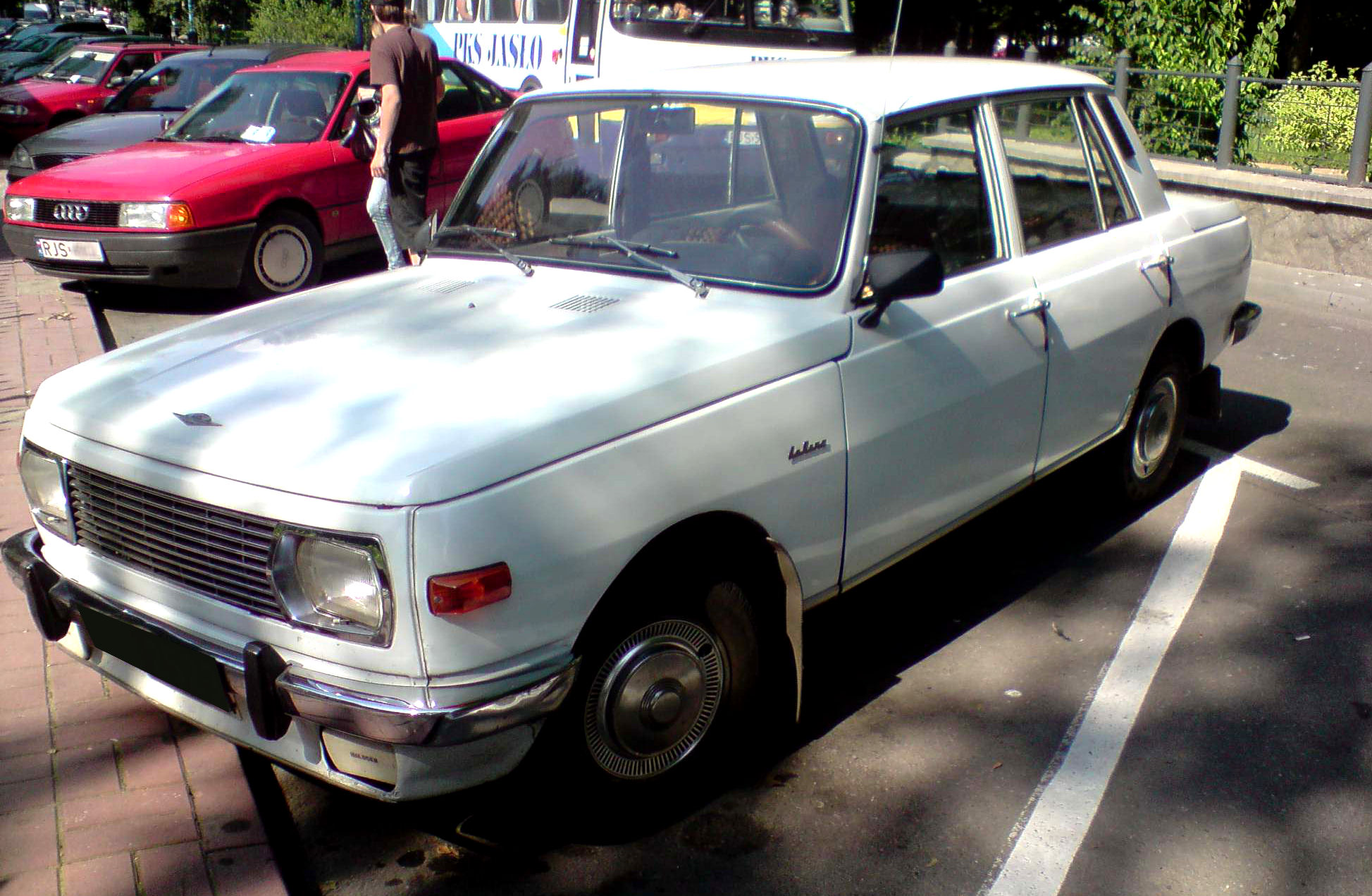
Early Wartburg 353 with chrome grille and bumper

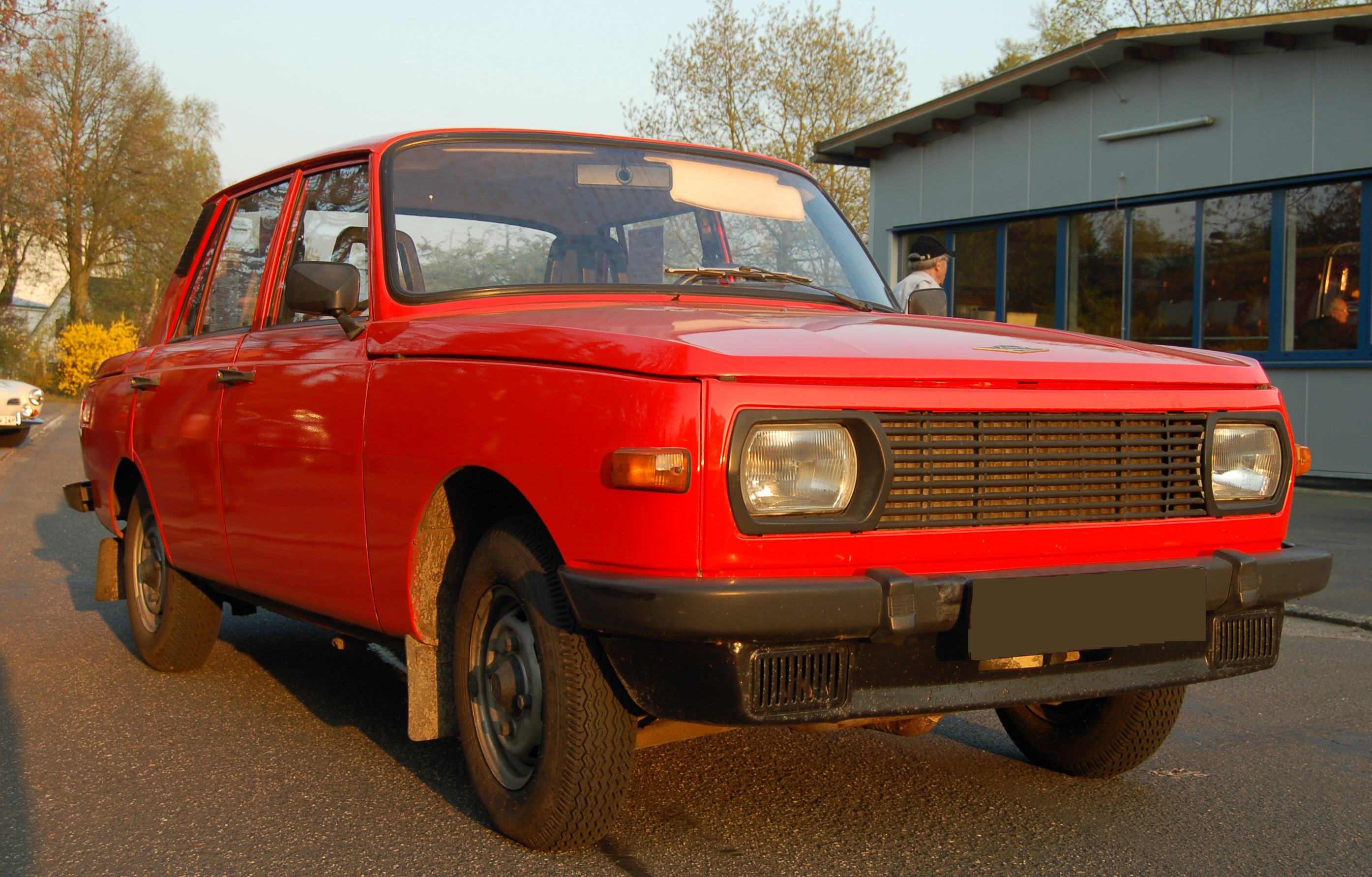
Later model with black radiator grille and bumper

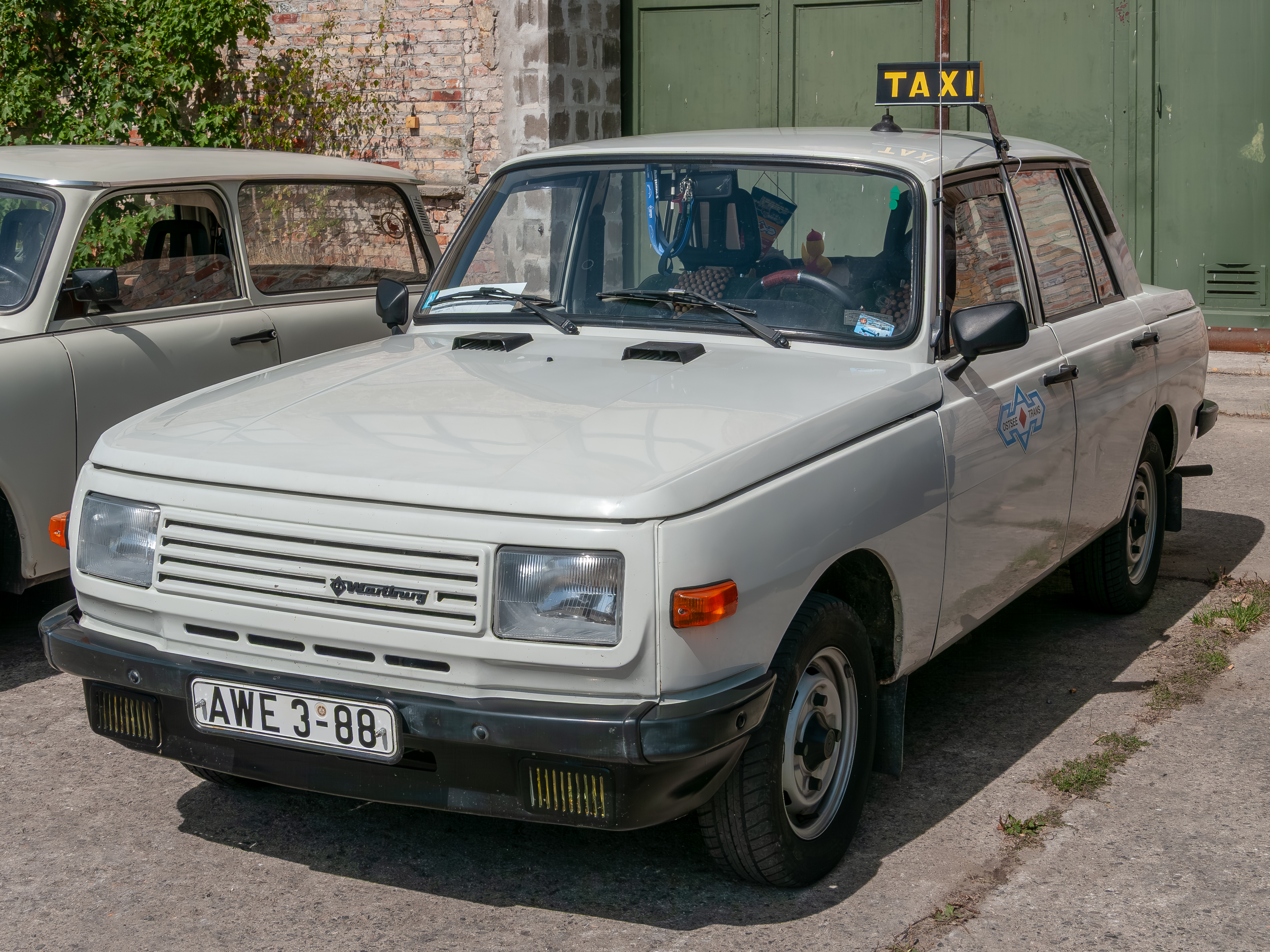
Wartburg 353 W sedan, post-1985 facelift model

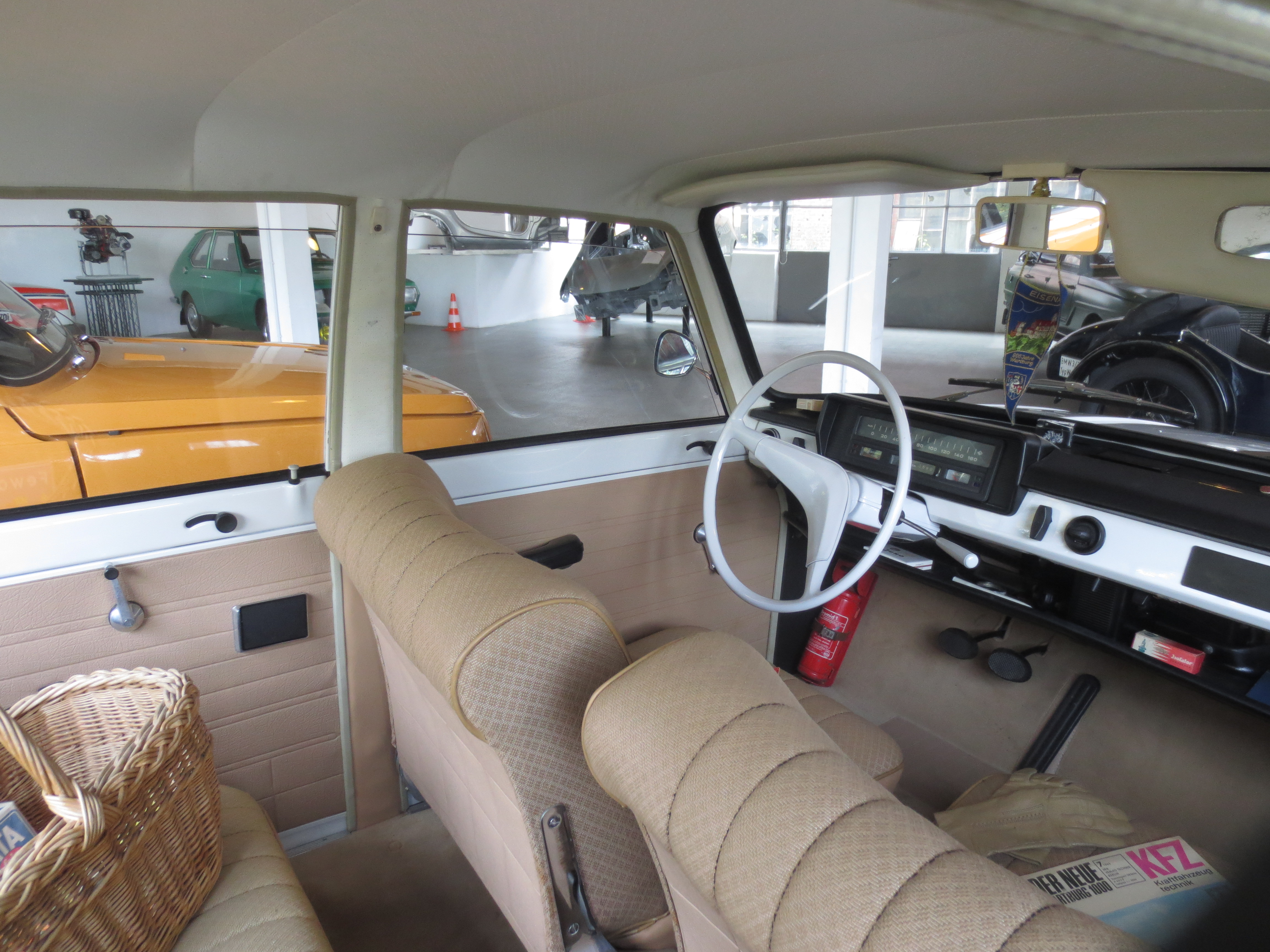
Wartburg 353 interior

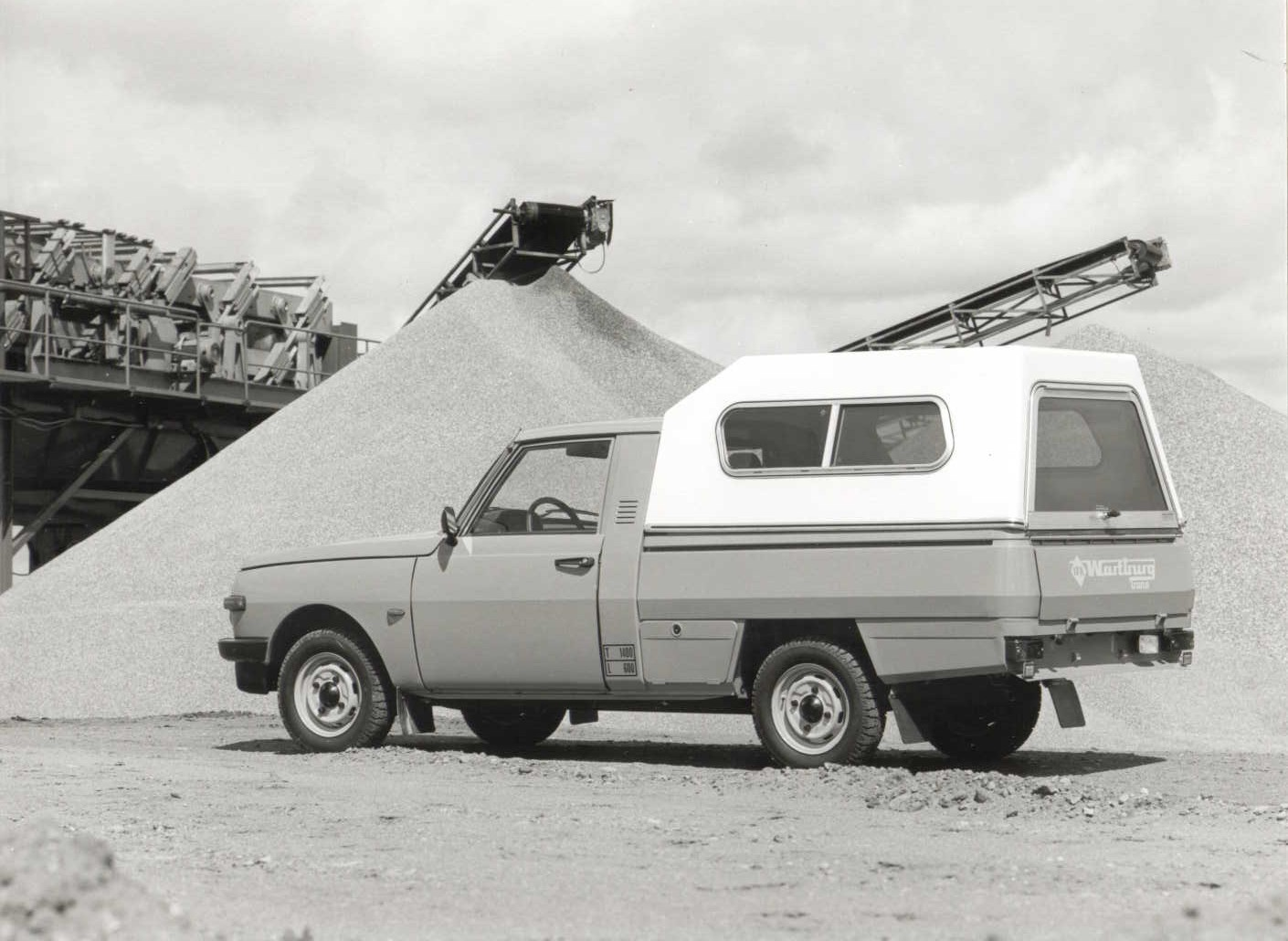
353-400 Trans pickup model, for export only

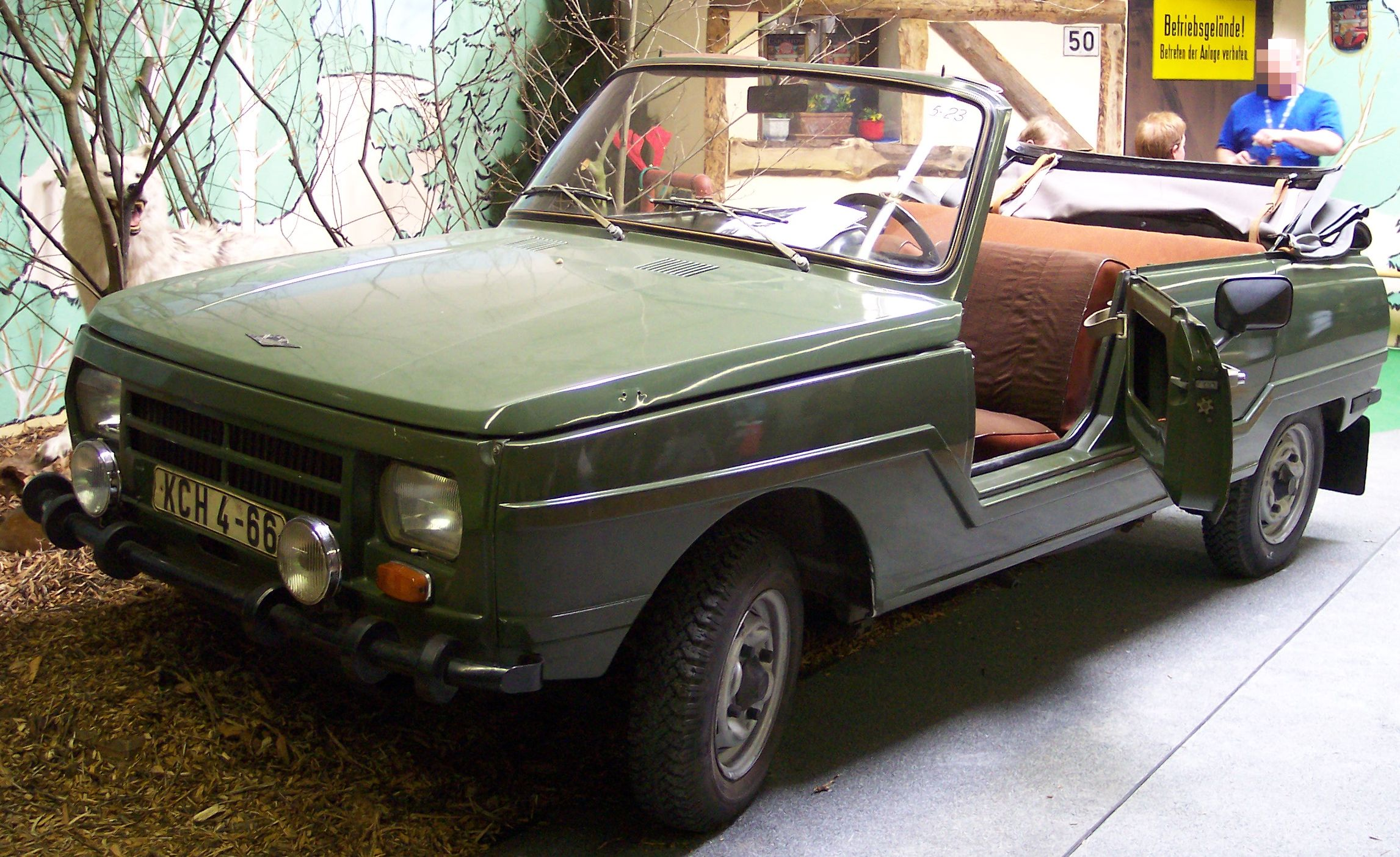
Wartburg 400 prototype for military use

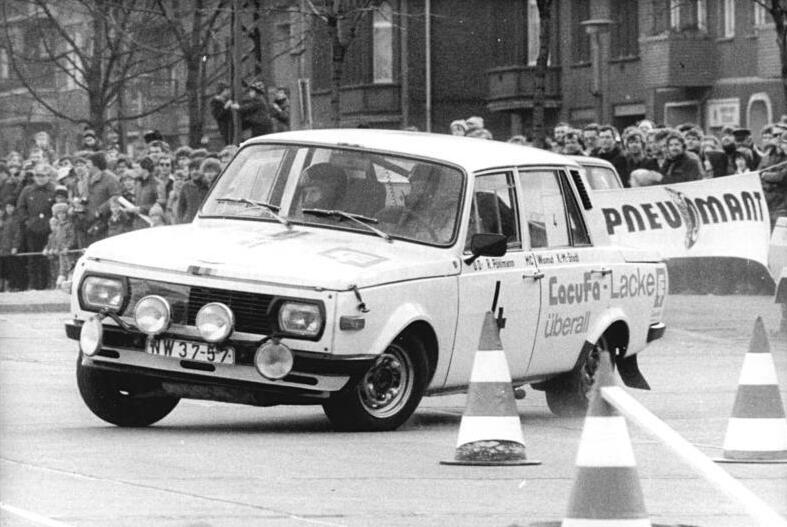
Rally version

== Specifications: Wartburg 353 ==
Technical specifications
| | Wartburg 353 (until 1985) | Wartburg 353 (from 1986) |
|---|---|---|
| Dimensions (L×W×H) | Limousine (saloon): 4,220×1,640×1,495 mm Tourist (estate): 4,380×1,640×1,495 mm | |
| Wheelbase | 2450 mm | |
| Boot size | 525 L (saloon); 1940×1300×860 mm (estate) | |
| Mass | 920 kg (saloon); 970 kg (estate) | |
| Payload | 400 kg (saloon); 440 kg (estate) | |
| Engine | two-stroke, three-cylinder, petrol engine, liquid cooled | |
| Displacement | 992 cm^{3} | |
| Rated power | 37 kW | 42 kW |
| Max. torque | 100 N·m at 3000/min | 106 N·m at 3000/min |
| Fuel | VK88 (petroil, 1:50, 88 RON) | |
| Carburettor | BVF-40 downdraught carburettor | Jikov 32 Sedr downdraught carburettor |
| Gearbox | Four-speed synchromesh, freewheel device for all gears | |
| Clutch | T 10-12K dry single-disc clutch | |
| Suspension | Double-wishbone front suspension, rigid rear live axle | |
| Tyres | 165 SR-13, 175/70 R13 or 185-SR 13 | |
| Turning radius | 5.1 m | |
| Braking system | Front disc brakes, rear drum brakes | |
| Battery | 12 V lead-acid battery, 38 Ah | |
| Alternator | DC 12 V, 220 W | DC 12 V, 588 W |
| Ignition system | Battery-ignition system with three direct-fire ignition coils, and three breakers | |
| Headlamps | | H4 60/55 W |
| Source | | |

== Specifications: Wartburg 353 WR ==
- Three-cylinder, two-stroke engine with 115 PS (85 kW) at 5500 rpm and a torque of 152 N⋅m (112 lb⋅ft) at 4200 rpm, engine capacity 1147 cc, three BVF flat current motorcycle racing carburetor, three modified Trabant air filters, power-optimized exhaust system depending on the application range, top speed 188 km/h (117 mph), 1:40 oil/petrol mixture held in a modified 62-liter tank.
- Five-speed transmission with lockable freewheel.
- reinforced closed box section frame, tuned coil springs with gas pressure shock absorbers, internally ventilated disc brakes, rear drum brakes, 6J13-cast magnesium wheels with 185/60 R13 tires
- Length 4,220 mm (166.1 in), width 1,642 mm (64.6 in), height 1,465 mm (57.7 in), empty weight 815 kg (1,797 lb).
- Body parts, GFP fenders front and rear, GFP bumpers, GFP-bucket seats.
- Safety roll cage, removable auxiliary lights, tachometer, sports belts.

== In popular culture ==
Serbian punk rock band Atheist Rap dedicated a song to Wartburg 353 on their debut album 'Maori i Crni Gonzales' from 1993, titled 'Wartburg Limuzina' ("Wartburg Limousine"), which reflects on the car's characteristics in a humorous but positive way. The song spawned a sequel on their second album 'Ja Eventualno Bih Ako Njega Eliminišete' from 1996, titled 'Car Core', about tuning a Wartburg, also in a humorous way. Both songs were made into music videos and remain among their greatest hits to this day.

== See also ==
- Nissan Rasheen a very small and short 4WD that is often compared to Eastern European cars in design, particularly the Wartburg 353,
